= Armenia–India relations =

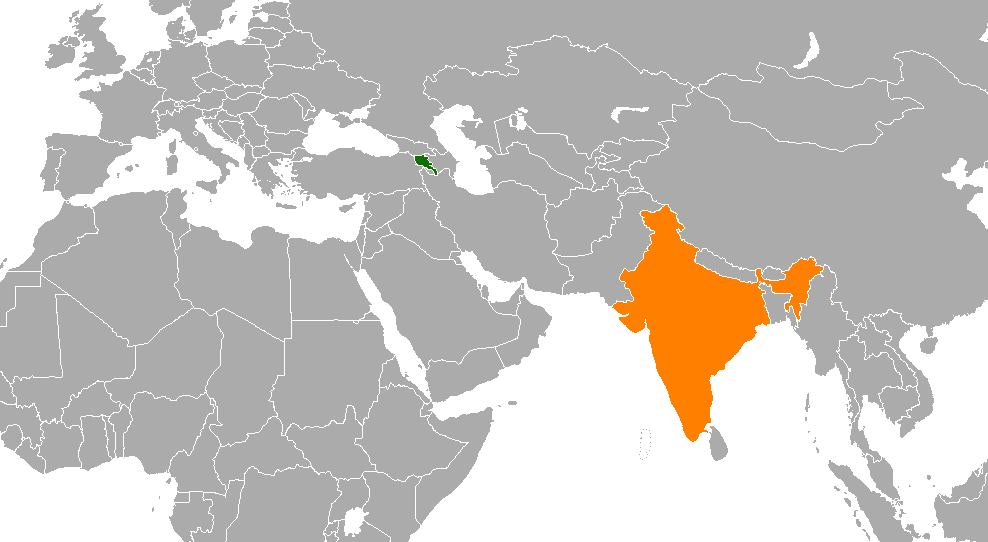

- Armenia: India

Diplomatic mission
- Embassy of Armenia, New Delhi: Embassy of India, Yerevan

International relations between Armenia and India have been described as friendly. The two countries share a strong burgeoning relationship in economics, culture, military and technology. In 2022, it was reported that the two nations were exploring possibilities of long-term military cooperation. Armenia has an embassy in New Delhi. India has an embassy in Yerevan.

== History ==
=== Early history ===
Armenians are believed to have traveled to India, when some Armenians joined the auxiliary elements of the forces under the command of Alexander the Great when he crossed Armenia en route to India. The earliest documented references to the mutual relationship of Armenians and Indians are found in Cyropaedia (Persian Expedition), an ancient Greek work by Xenophon (430 BC – 355 BC). These references indicate that several Armenians travelled to India, and they were well aware of land routes to reach India, as also the general and political geography, socio-cultural milieu, and economic life of the Indian subcontinent.

An archive directory (published 1956) in Delhi states that Armenian merchant-cum-diplomat Thomas of Cana arrived on the Malabar Coast in 780 AD using the overland route. Thomas was an affluent merchant dealing chiefly in spices and muslins. He was also instrumental in obtaining a decree, inscribed on a copperplate, from the Chera Dynasty, which conferred several commercial, social and religious privileges for the regional Saint Thomas Christians. In current local references, Thomas of Cana is known as Knayi Thomman or Kanaj Tomma, meaning "Thomas the merchant". Armenians had trade relations with several parts of India, and by the 7th century a few Armenian settlements had appeared in the present-day state of Kerala on the Malabar Coast. Armenians controlled a large part of the international trade of the area, particularly in precious stones and quality fabrics.

=== Medieval history ===
Mughal emperor Akbar (1556–1605), invited Armenians to settle in Agra in the 16th century, and by the middle of the 19th century, Agra had a sizeable Armenian population. Armenian traders visited Agra during the Mughal Empire. By an imperial decree, Armenian merchants were exempted from paying taxes on the merchandise imported and exported by them, and they were also allowed to move around in the areas of the Mughal Empire where entry of foreigners was otherwise prohibited. In 1562, an Armenian Church was constructed in Agra. From the 16th century onwards, the Armenians (mostly from Persia) formed an important trading community in Surat, the most active Indian port of that period, located on the western coast of India. The port city of Surat used to have regular sea borne to and fro traffic of merchant vessels from Basra (in present-day Iraq) and Bandar Abbas (in present-day Iran). Armenians built two Churches and a cemetery in Surat. A tombstone in the city, dating back to 1579, bears Armenian inscriptions. The second Church was built in 1778 and was dedicated to Mary. An Armenian language manuscript written in 1678, currently preserved in Saltikov-Shchedrin Library, St. Petersburg, has an account of a permanent colony of Armenians in Surat. The Armenians settled in Chinsurah, near Calcutta, West Bengal, and in 1697 built a Church there. This is the second oldest Church in Bengal and is still in well preserved on account of the care of the Calcutta Armenian Church Committee. In 1712, the Armenian Church of Chennai was built and there was a significant Armenian community in Chennai with valuable contributions to the city. Most notable was Coja Petrus Uscan who built the Marmalong bridge as charity.

=== Modern history ===
Indian President Sarvepalli Radhakrishnan visited the Armenian Soviet Socialist Republic in September 1964, and Prime Minister Indira Gandhi visited in June 1976.

India recognized Armenia on 26 December 1991, three months after it declared independence from the Soviet Union. Diplomatic relations between India and Armenia were established on 31 August 1992. India opened its embassy in Yerevan on 1 March 1999. Armenia, which had opened an honorary consulate in April 1994, established its embassy in New Delhi in October 1999.

Armenian Presidents Levon Ter-Petrosyan, Robert Kocharyan and Serzh Sargsyan visited India in 1995, 2003 and 2017 respectively.

In 2019 after an interview with WION, Prime Minister Nikol Pashinyan has stated that Armenia supports India in the Kashmir conflict between India and Pakistan.

Armenia signed an agreement to purchase four Swathi Weapon Locating Radars for US$40 million from India in March 2020. In September 2022, Armenia signed an agreement worth ₹2,000 crore (US$210 million) to purchase four batteries of Pinaka multi-barrel rocket launchers, anti-tank rockets, and various types of ammunition from India. Since 2022, India is also supplying anti-drone systems, ATAGS towed howitzers, TC-20 (MARG) Wheeled self-propelled howitzers, Ashwin Ballistic Missile Interceptors, and Akash air defence missiles to Armenia.

== Cultural relationship ==
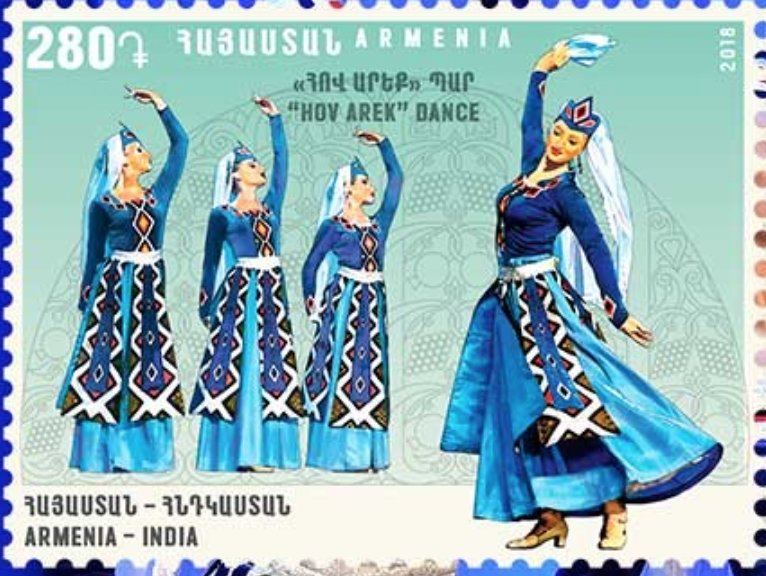
Hov Arek Armenian Dance, the national dance of Armenia

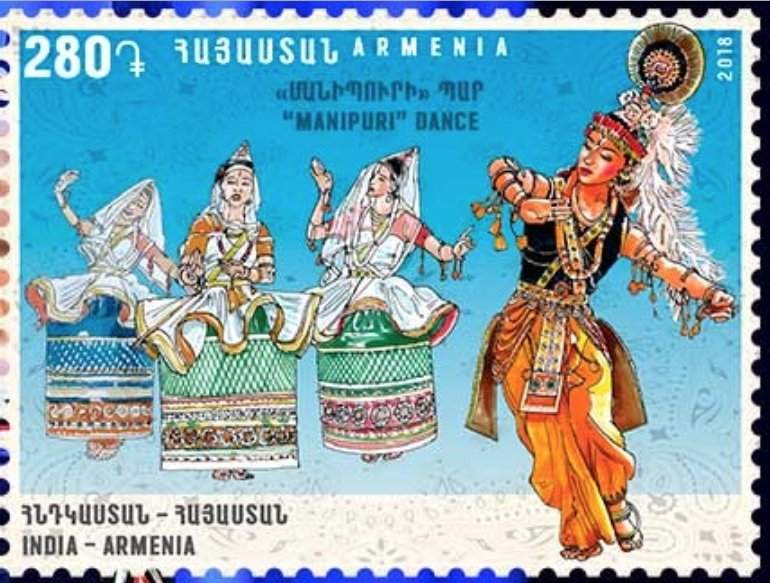
Indian Classical Dance "Manipuri"

Armenia and India organised a joint issuing of postage stamps, illustrating the cultural heritage of the two nations. The Indian Manipuri classical dance of Meitei civilization, and the Armenian Hov Arek, are referred to as the "National Dances" (of India and Armenia respectively) during the Armenia-India joint issue of postage stamps. In 2025, Indian author Dr. Prashant Madanmohan organized the Indo-Armenian-French Art & Literary Confluence in Chennai, showcasing cultural unity through literature and art, including themes of memory, identity, and the Armenian Genocide.

== Armenian genocide recognition ==
India has not recognized the Armenian genocide. However, during World War I, when India was under British colonial rule, the country found itself at war against the Ottoman Empire, the predecessor of Turkey. Many Armenians sought refuge in India, most notably in Calcutta. With the relations between India and Turkey worsening since the 2010s, mainly due to Turkey's open support for Pakistan, which shares a similar stance with Turkey, there have been growing calls for recognition of the Armenian genocide in India. For the first time, under the Premiership of Narendra Modi, the Indian embassy in Armenia has mentioned the genocide and Indian ambassador Kishan Dan Dewal also paid respect to the victims of the genocide in 2021.

== Resident diplomatic missions ==
Armenia

- New Delhi (Embassy)

India

- Yerevan (Embassy)

== See also ==
- Armenian Church, Chennai
- Armenian Church of St. John the Baptist
- Armenian cemetery in Hyderabad
- Armenians in India
- Hinduism in Armenia
- India–Russia relations
- Armenia–Pakistan relations
