= Armenian Apostolic Church in Myanmar =

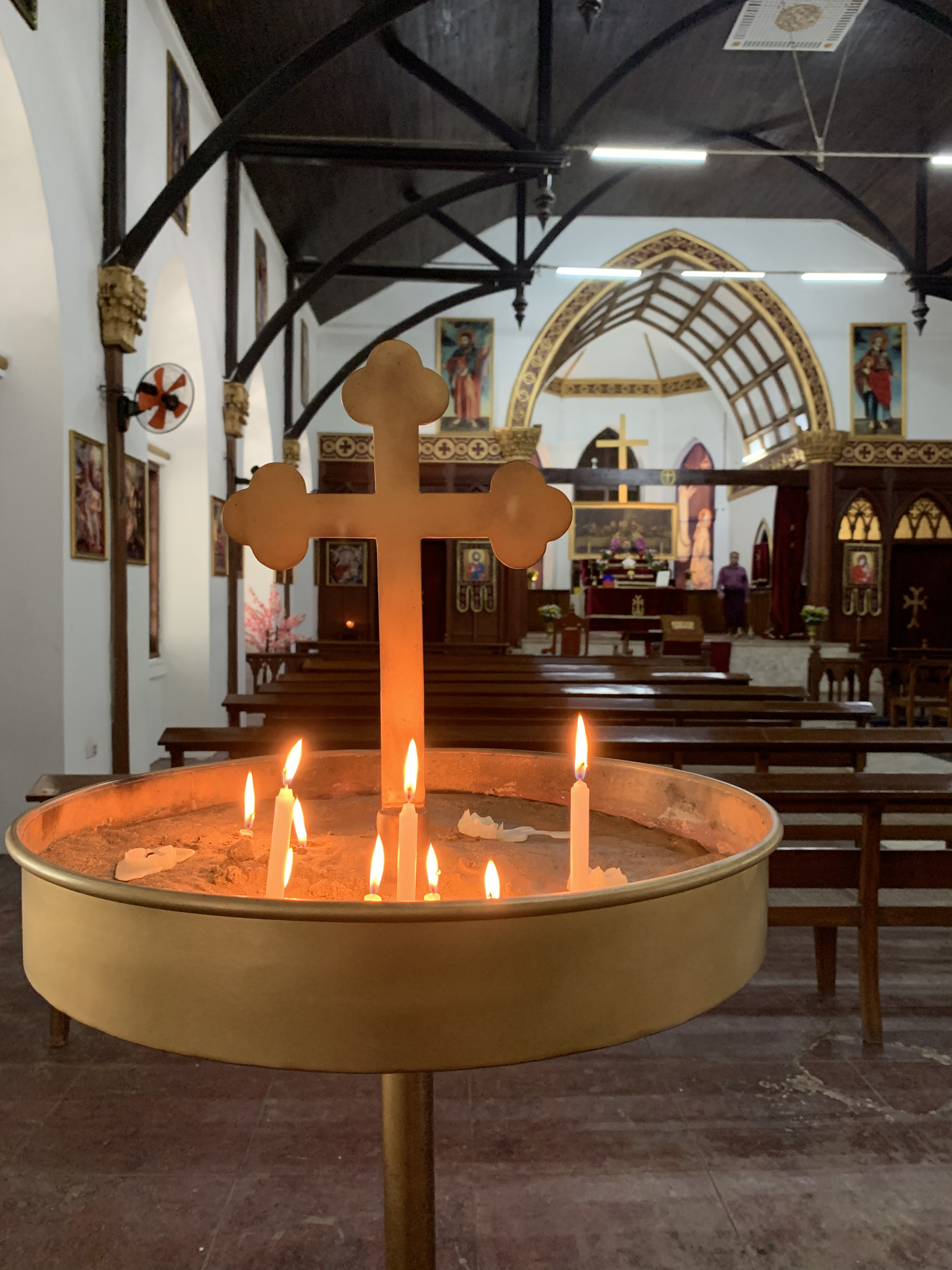
Interior view of the Armenian Apostolic Church of St. John the Baptist in Yangon, Myanmar

Oriental Orthodox Christianity is represented in Myanmar by a church of the Armenian Orthodox Church. Reports of inscriptions in Greek dating back to the 13th century may indicate an earlier (now extinct) Orthodox presence in what is now modern-day Myanmar.

== Armenian Orthodoxy in Myanmar ==
Whatever historical presence the Orthodox Church may have had, thanks to the large Armenian merchant community in Burma there were at one time four Armenian Orthodox churches in what is today Myanmar in the cities of Mandalay, Bago, Syriam, and Yangon. The only active church today is St. John the Baptist's in Yangon under the jurisdiction of the Armenian Orthodox Church of Echmiadzin.

== See also ==
- Armenians in Myanmar
