= Armenian cemetery in Hyderabad =

Cemetery in Telangana, India

Uppuguda Armenian cemetery
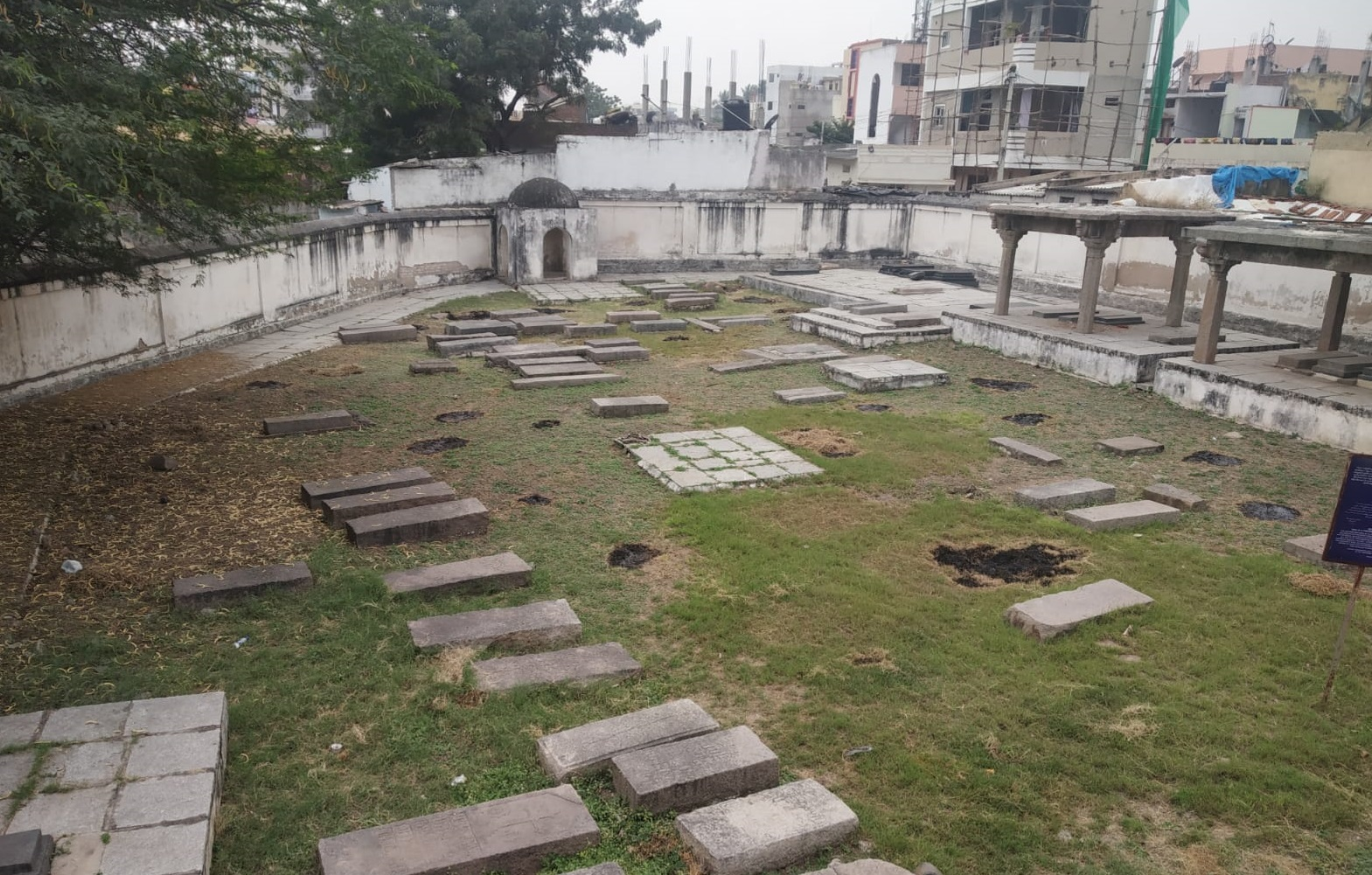
- The Armenian cemetery in 2021
- Interactive map of Uppuguda Armenian cemetery

Details
- Location: Uppuguda, Hyderabad, Telangana
- Country: India
- Coordinates: 17°18′N 78°30′E
- Type: Armenian
- Owned by: Archaeological Survey of India
- No. of graves: 19

The Armenian cemetery in Hyderabad, also known as Uppuguda Armenian cemetery, is a cemetery in Uppuguda, a suburb of Hyderabad, India. It is 300 years old, created in the Qutb Shahi period.

== History ==
There was considerable Armenian settlement in Hyderabad, as the Armenian community of Hyderabad received a Pontifical Bull from Holy Etchmiadzin. The cemetery was shared by Dutch and English people residing in Hyderabad in those times as there was no specific cemetery for them.

== The site ==
The site houses Armenian cemeteries and churchyard. A total of 19 Armenian people are buried in this cemetery, including two priests: Rev. Johannes (1680) and Rev. Simon (1724). This is the last known trace of the Armenian relation with the city of Hyderabad.

The Armenian cemetery in Hyderabad is protected monument by Department of Archaeology under the Archaeological Sites and Remains Act 1960. However, it has been allowed to deteriorate.

== See also ==
- Armenians in India
- Armenia–India relations
