= Armenian Church, Chennai =

Armenian church building in India

St. Mary Church Սուրբ Աստվածածին Եկեղեցի
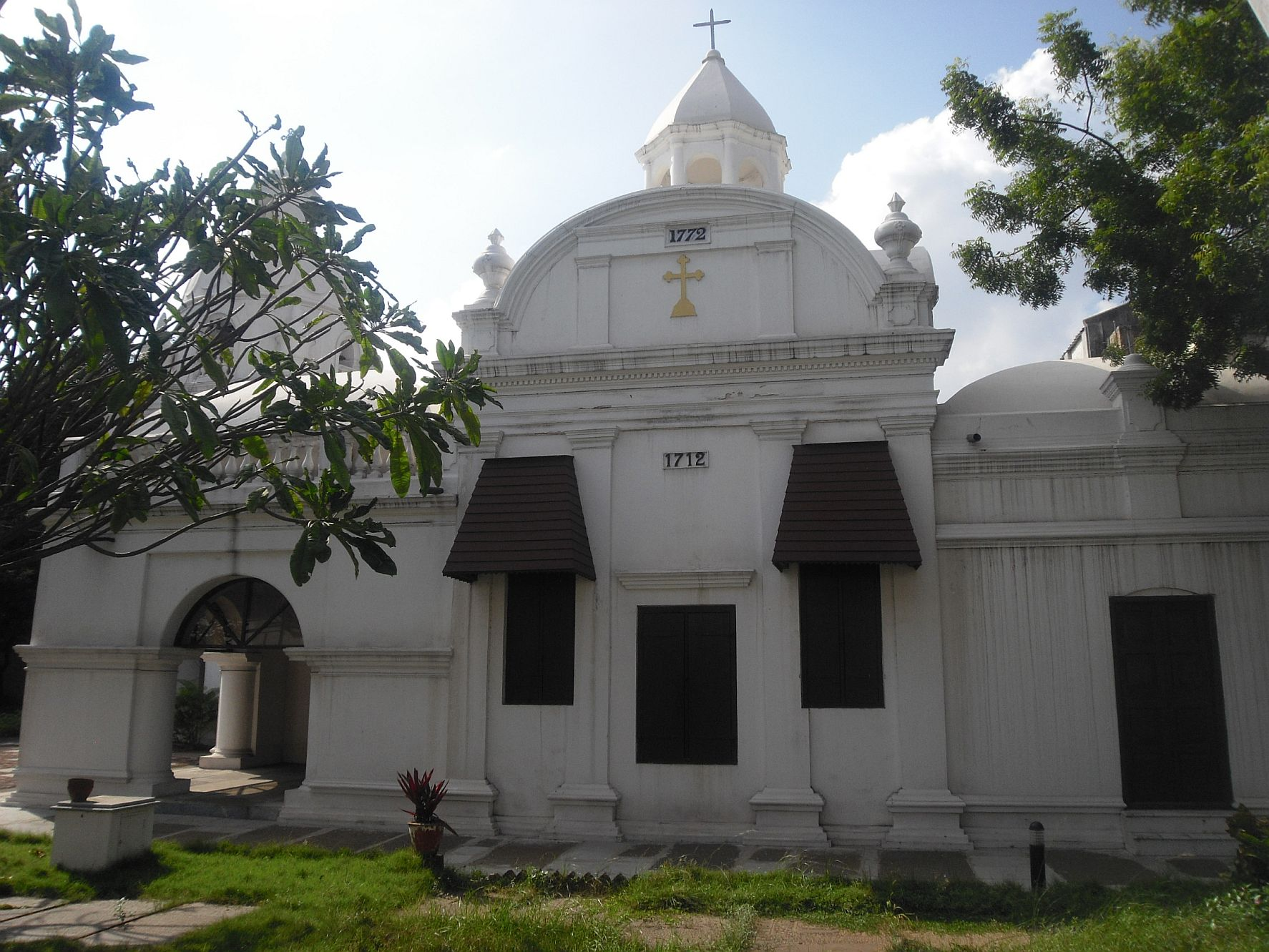
- St. Mary Armenian Church, Chennai

- Location within India

Religion
- Affiliation: Armenian Apostolic Church
- Rite: Armenian

Location
- Location: George Town, Tamil Nadu; India
- Coordinates: 13.0891°N 80.2873°E

Architecture
- Style: Armenian
- Completed: 1712, rebuilt 1772

Saint Mary Church of Chennai (Armenian: Սուրբ Աստվածածին Եկեղեցի), constructed in 1712 and reconstructed in 1772, is one of the oldest churches of the Indian subcontinent, located in Chennai. It is famous for its belfry of six. The Church, also called the Armenian Church of Virgin Mary, is located on the Armenian Street in the neighbourhood of George Town.

Trevor Alexander was the caretaker of the Church until 2014; as on 2019, Jude Johnson, who is a relative of Trevor Alexander, is the care taker.

== The Church ==
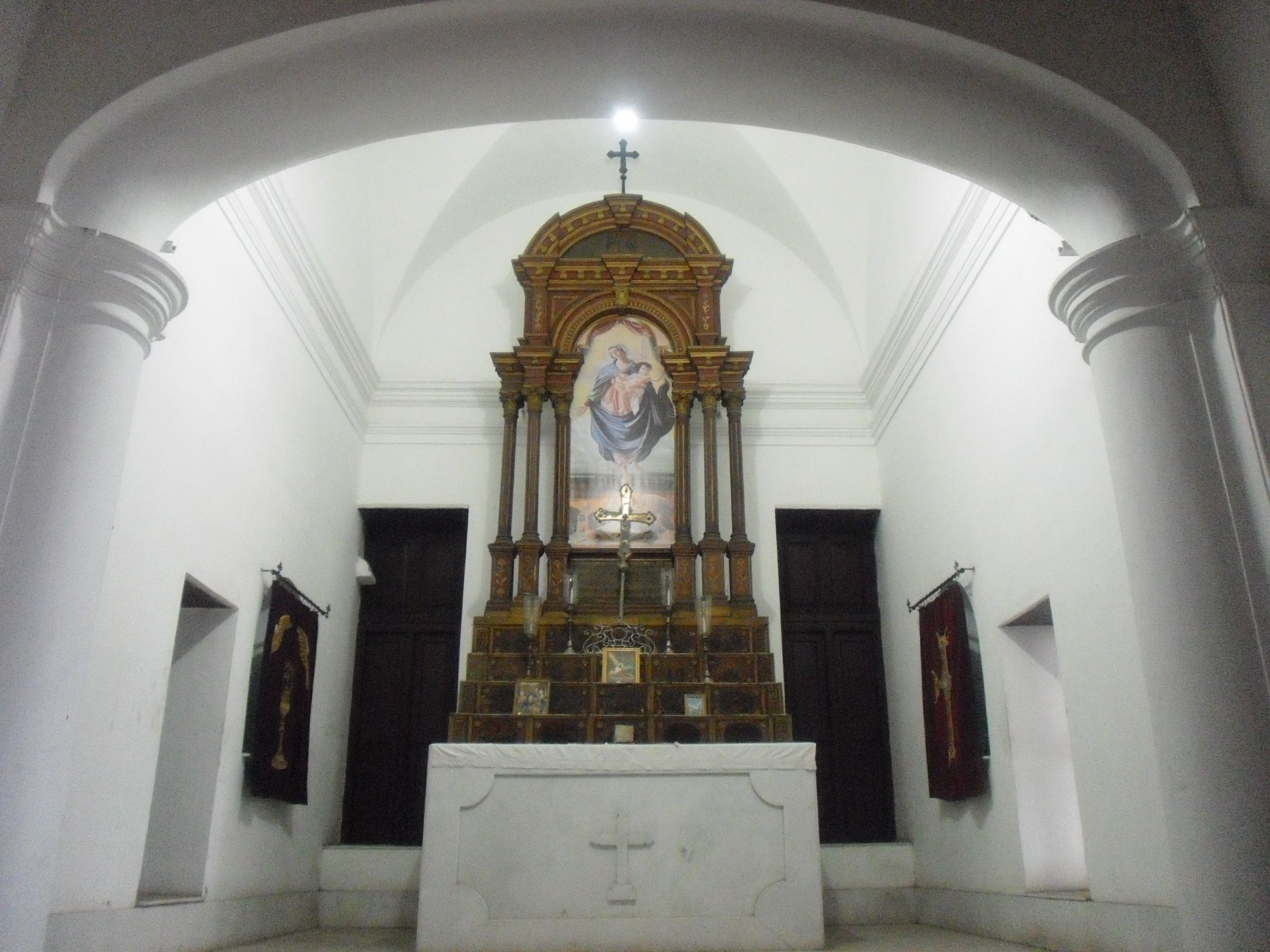
Altar Armenian Church in Chennai.

The Church has a commemorative plaque honoring the benevolent Armenian- Coja Petrus Oscan, an Armenian merchant who settled in Chennai, India was notably generous with his wealth.Aga Shawmier succeeded Oscan as leader of the Armenian merchant settlement and this church was built (and consecrated in 1772) in his chapel grounds.

- It is funded by the Armenian Apostolic Church and maintained by The Armenian Church Committee in Calcutta.
- The graves of about 350 Armenians have been laid out throughout the Church.
- The founder, publisher and editor of the world's first Armenian periodical "Azdarar", Harutyun Shmavonyan, is buried here.
- The Belfry adjacent to the main Church structure houses six large bells which are rung every Sunday at 9:30 am by the caretaker.
- Functioning now as a heritage site, the Church is opened for visitors from 9 am till 2:30 pm.

The Armenians were a select group of merchants in the Madras Presidency. They came all the way from Armenia to Madras. When the British were trading cotton cloth, Armenians dealt with fine silk, expensive spices and gems.

Madras once housed a small but a thriving Armenian population. Today three families in Chennai visit the church to offer their prayers and preserve their cultural heritage. The various Armenian heritage sites and their stories including the Church have been chronicled in the Armenia Virtual Museum

== Bells ==
The six bells are all of different sizes, varying from 21 to 26 inches, and weigh around 150 kg each, They are believed to be the largest and heaviest bells of Chennai. The bells were cast at different times as noted below:

- One bell, with Armenian inscription dates to 1754. This was recast in 1808 and also bears Tamil inscription.
- One bell's inscription indicates that it dates to 1778.
- Inscriptions on two bells indicate that they were given to the Church in memory of 19 year Eliazar Shawmier, buried in the Church's garden. Shawmier was the youngest son of a leading Armenian merchant of the city of Madras (now Chennai) on whose private chapel ground the present Church stands.
- The remaining two bells date to 1837 and were cast by the Whitechapel Bell Foundry, then known as Mears & Stainbank, with inscriptions reading "Thomas Mears, Founder, London".

== Gallery ==
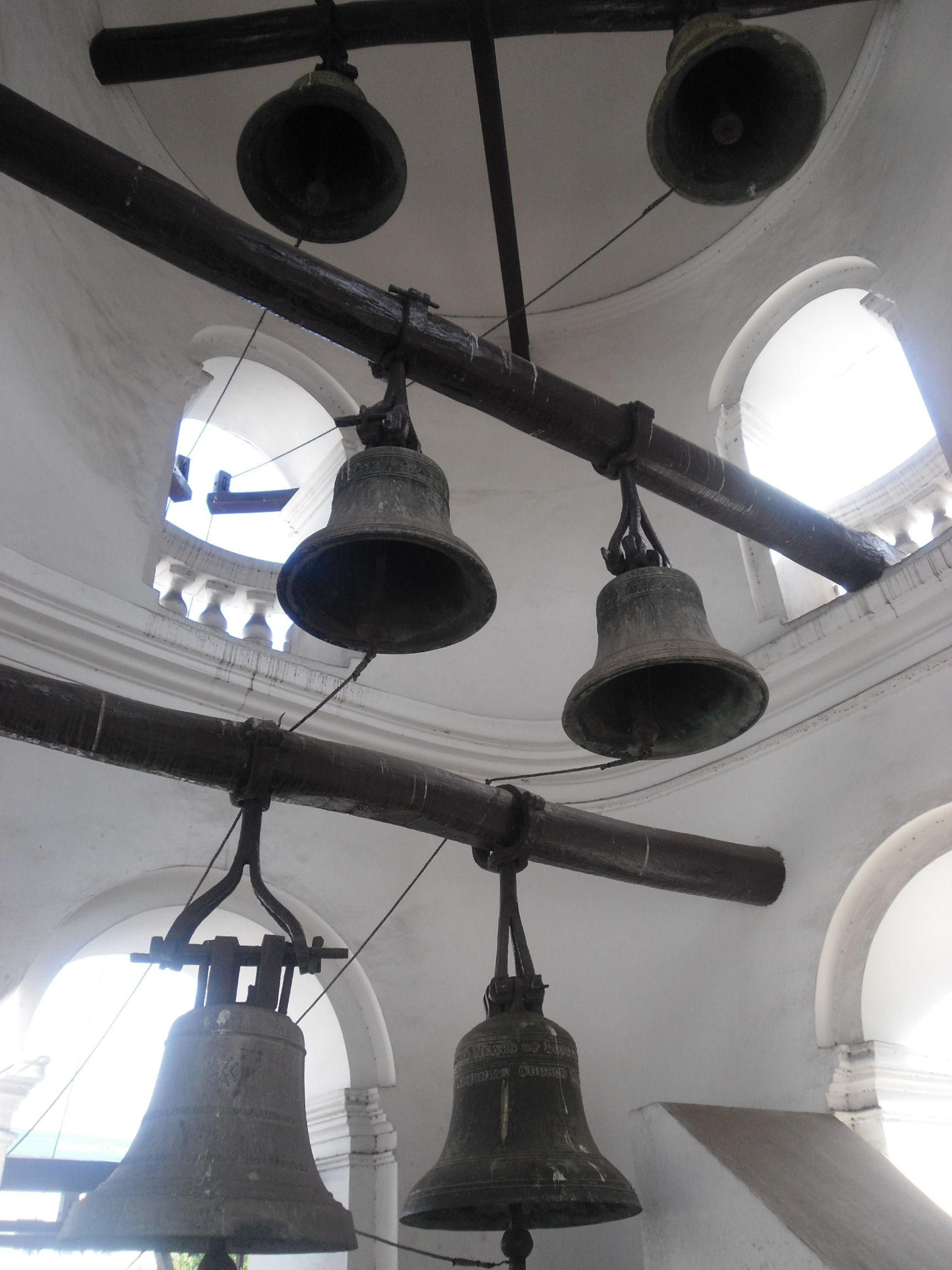
Bells of the Armenian Church in Madras

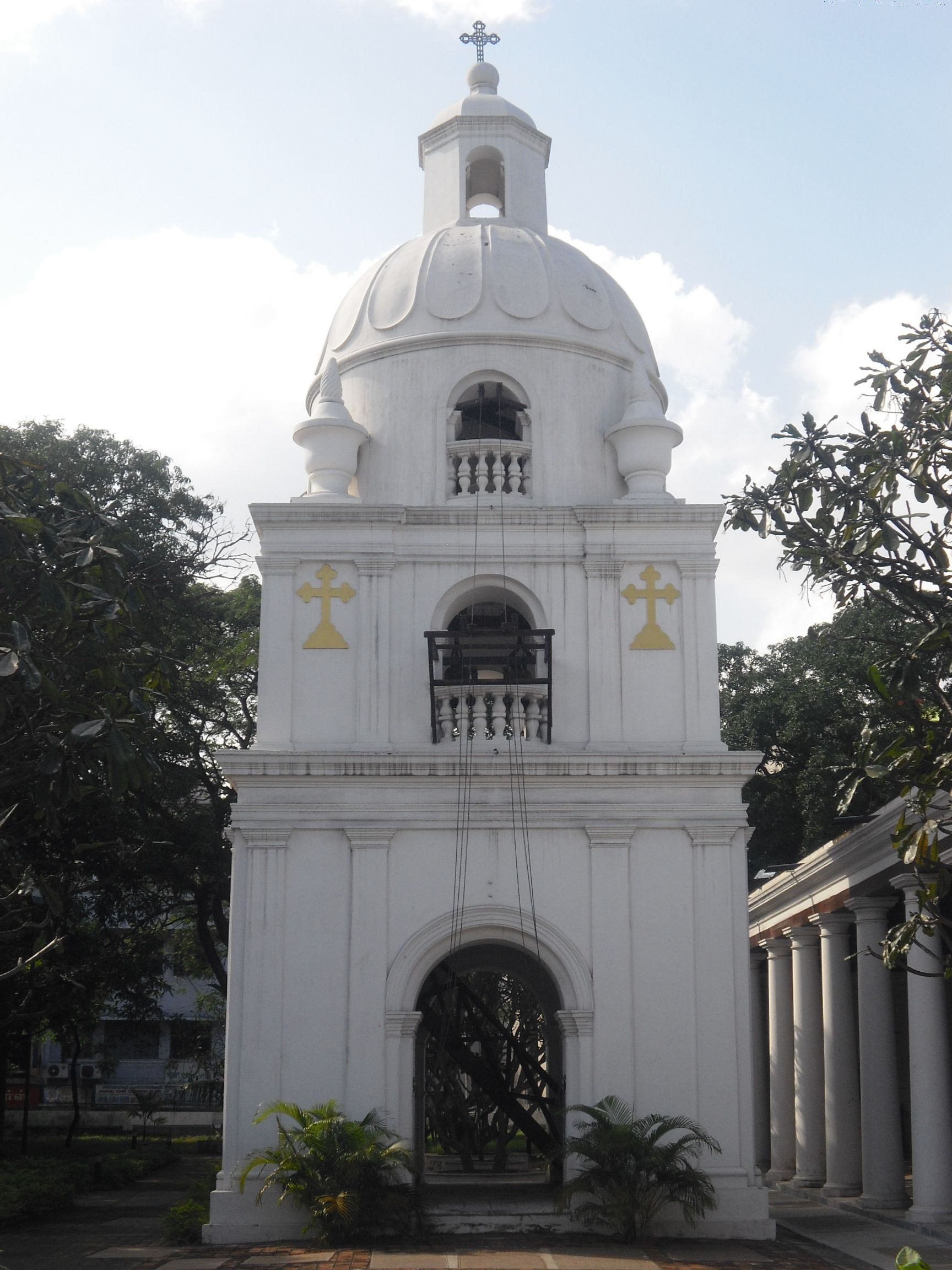
Belfry of the Armenian Church in Madras

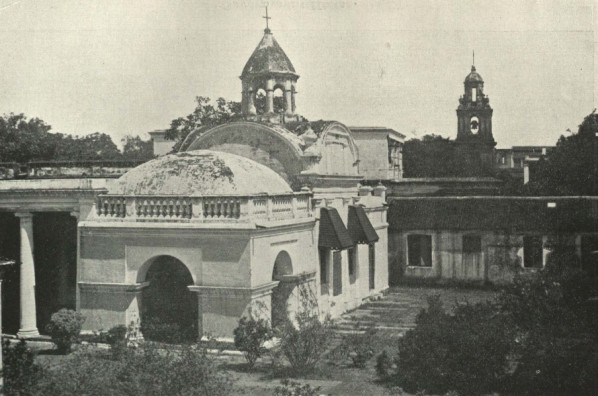
The Armenian Church of St. Mary, c. 1905

== See also ==
- Armenians in India
- History of Chennai
- George Town
