= Armenian Church of St. John the Baptist =

Building in India

St. John the Baptist Church Սուրբ Հովհաննես Մկրտիչ Եկեղեցի
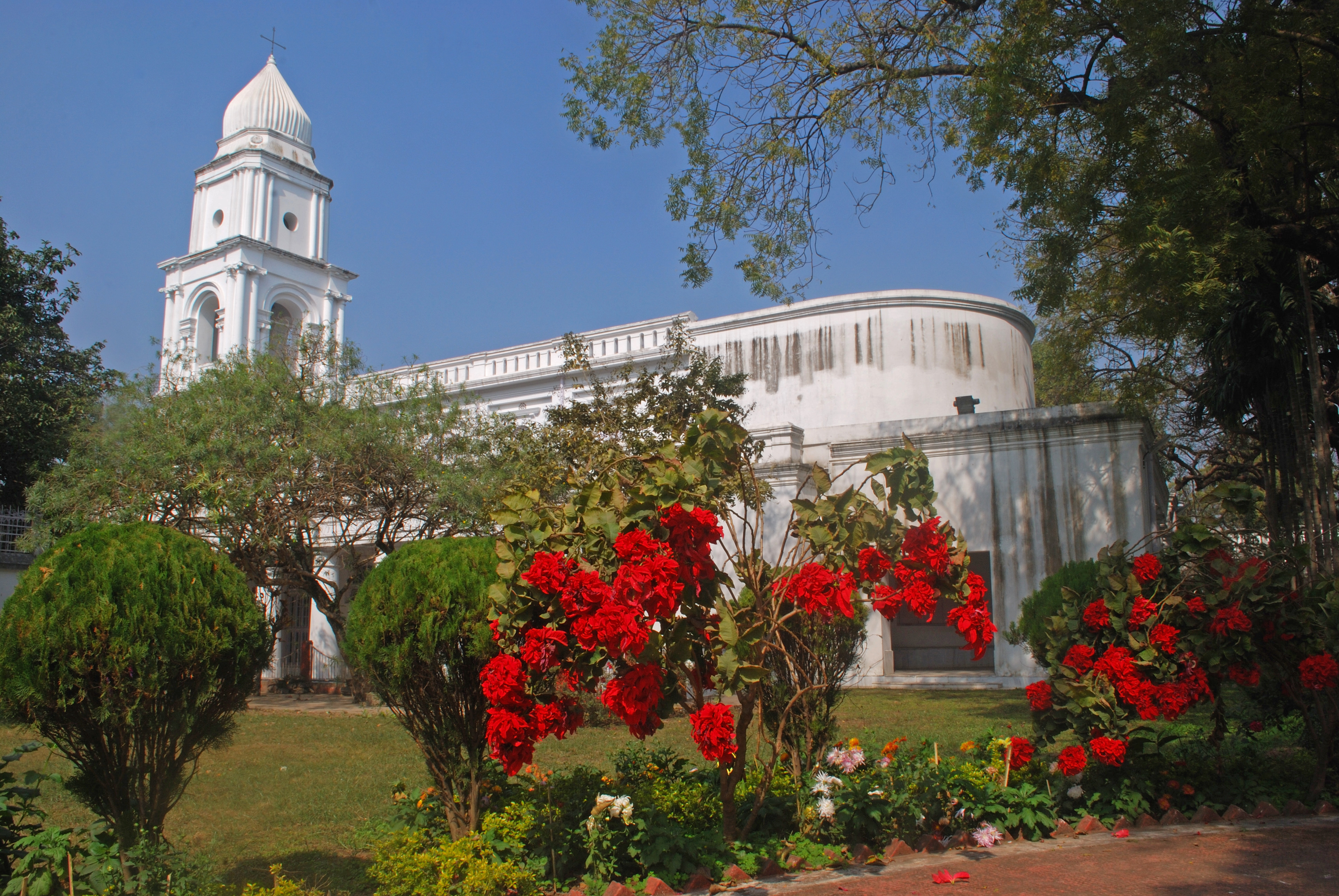
- St. John Armenian Church, Chinsura

- Location within India

Religion
- Affiliation: Armenian Apostolic Church
- Rite: Armenian

Location
- Location: Chinsura, West Bengal; India
- Coordinates: 22.89103151°N 88.40060413°E

Architecture
- Style: Armenian
- Groundbreaking: 1695
- Completed: 1697

St. John the Baptist Church of Chinsura (Armenian: Սուրբ Յովհաննէս Մկրտիչ Եկեղեցի), is located in Chinsura, India. The church was built in 1695–1697 and is dedicated to St. John the Baptist. It is the second-oldest Christian church in Bengal, and the oldest Armenian church in India. The church is well preserved due to its proximity to Kolkata and the care committee of the Armenian Churches.

The Armenian Church of Chinsura was started in 1699. A spire was added to the church in 1822, for which the Dutch resident of Bengal Daniel Anthony Overbeek laid the foundation stone.

Each year on 13–14 January, the church celebrates the feast of John the Baptist, whose relics (bones of the left hand) are thought to be in the Armenian Church of Holy Nazareth, located 65 kilometers away, and delivered to the party in the Church Pilgrims. Armenians settled in Chinsura in 1645, after the Dutch, who formed their colony in 1625. On March 1, 2007, Catholicos of All Armenians Karekin II visited the church.

== See also ==
- Armenians in India
