= Harutyun Shmavonian =

Armenian priest (1750 – 1824)

Harutyun Shmavonian Հարություն Շմավոնյան
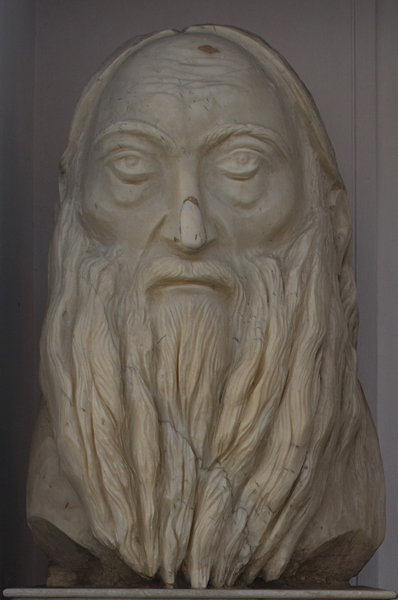
- Bust of Shmavonian, at the Armenian Church of the Holy Nazareth, Kolkata
- Born: 1750; Shiraz, Persia
- Died: 9 February 1824 (aged 73–74); Madras, India
- Notable credit: Founder of Armenian journal Azdarar

Harutyun Shmavonian (Armenian: Հարություն Շմավոնյան) (born Shiraz, Persia in 1750 - died Madras, India 1824) was a priest of the Armenian Apostolic Church noted as the founder of Armenian journalism through his publishing of the Armenian newspaper Azdarar (Monitor). The paper's first publication day was October 16th, now marked in Armenia as Armenian Press Day. He was also the publication's editor.

== Biography ==
Shmavonian born in 1750 in the Persian city Shiraz. He moved in 1784 to Madras (now Chennai), India where he served as an Armenian priest. In 1789, he founded a second Armenian publishing house.

In the October 1794 he founded the Armenian journal Azdarar (Armenian: Ազդարար). It was the first Armenian periodical publication ever published and Shmavonian is considered a pioneer because of his initiative and he was called the father of Armenian journalism. Financing of the new publication had been secured, but the number of readers was not very large. Shmavonian went on to publish 18 issues of "Azdarar" before it stopped in 1796.

Harutyun Shmavonian died in 1824.

== See also ==
- Azdarar
- Armenians in India
- Armenian printing
