= Azdarar =

First Armenian language newspaper

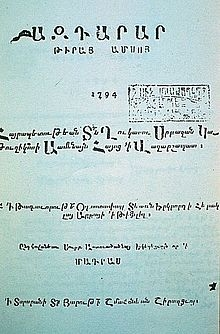
- Publisher: Harutyun Shmavonyan
- Editor: Harutyun Shmavonyan
- Founded: October 16, 1794
- Language: Western Armenian
- Headquarters: Madras, Madras Presidency, British India

Azdarar (Armenian: Ազդարար) (pronounced Aztarar in Western Armenian) was the first Armenian language newspaper ever published. It was established on October 16, 1794, in the city of Madras (now Chennai) in India by Father Harutyun Shmavonyan. It is also the first non-English newspaper to be published in India. The monthly covered mainly cultural and historical issues.

Azdarar continued for a year and a half until March 1796. During that period, Father Shmavonian published 18 issues, 965 pages in total.

== Other Armenian periodical publications in India ==
The publication of Azdarar in Madras in 1794 culminated in a series of other pioneering Armenian language publications in other cities of India including Ojanaspyurian (in Armenian Օճանասփիւռեան) in 1815 in Bombay, Hayeli Galgatian (in Armenian Հայելի Կալկաթեան meaning Calcuttan Mirror in Armenian) in Calcutta in 1820 and Shtemaran (Armenian Շտեմարան meaning repository in Armenian) in 1821 also in Calcutta, long before Constantinople (Istanbul) where the first Armenian periodical publication saw the light only in 1832․

== Commemorative stamp ==
The Armenian postal authorities published a stamp denominated as 30 Armenian drams in 1994 in commemoration of Father Shmavonian and his Azdarar publication's second centennial.

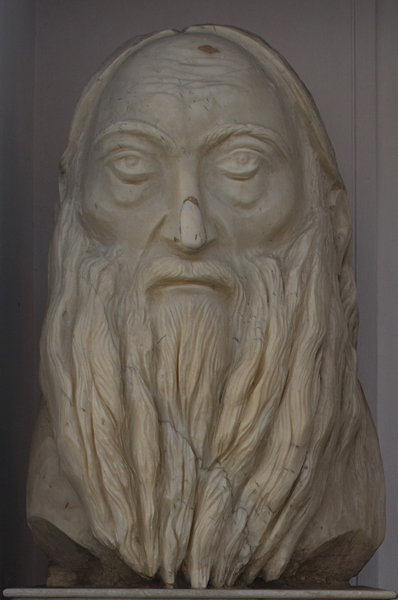
Bust of Harutyun Shmavonyan at the Armenian Church of the Holy Nazareth, Kolkata

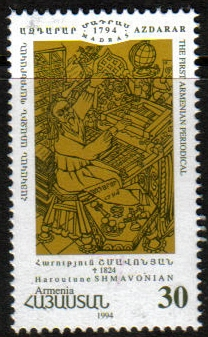
Armenian stamp on second centennial of the publication of Azdarar

== New publication ==
The new Azdarar publication

Azdarar is a publication under the same name has resumed in 2007, in Kolkata (Calcutta), India, after 210 years of the cessation of the original publication, as an initiative of Armenian-American astrophysicist Nora Andreasyan-Tomas.

Azdarar is being published monthly in Calcutta, whereas the original historic publication was in Madras. It is a color magazine of average of 40 colour pages.
