= Armenian Church of the Holy Nazareth =

Church in Kolkata, India

Holy Nazareth Armenian Church Սուրբ Նազարեթ Եկեղեցի
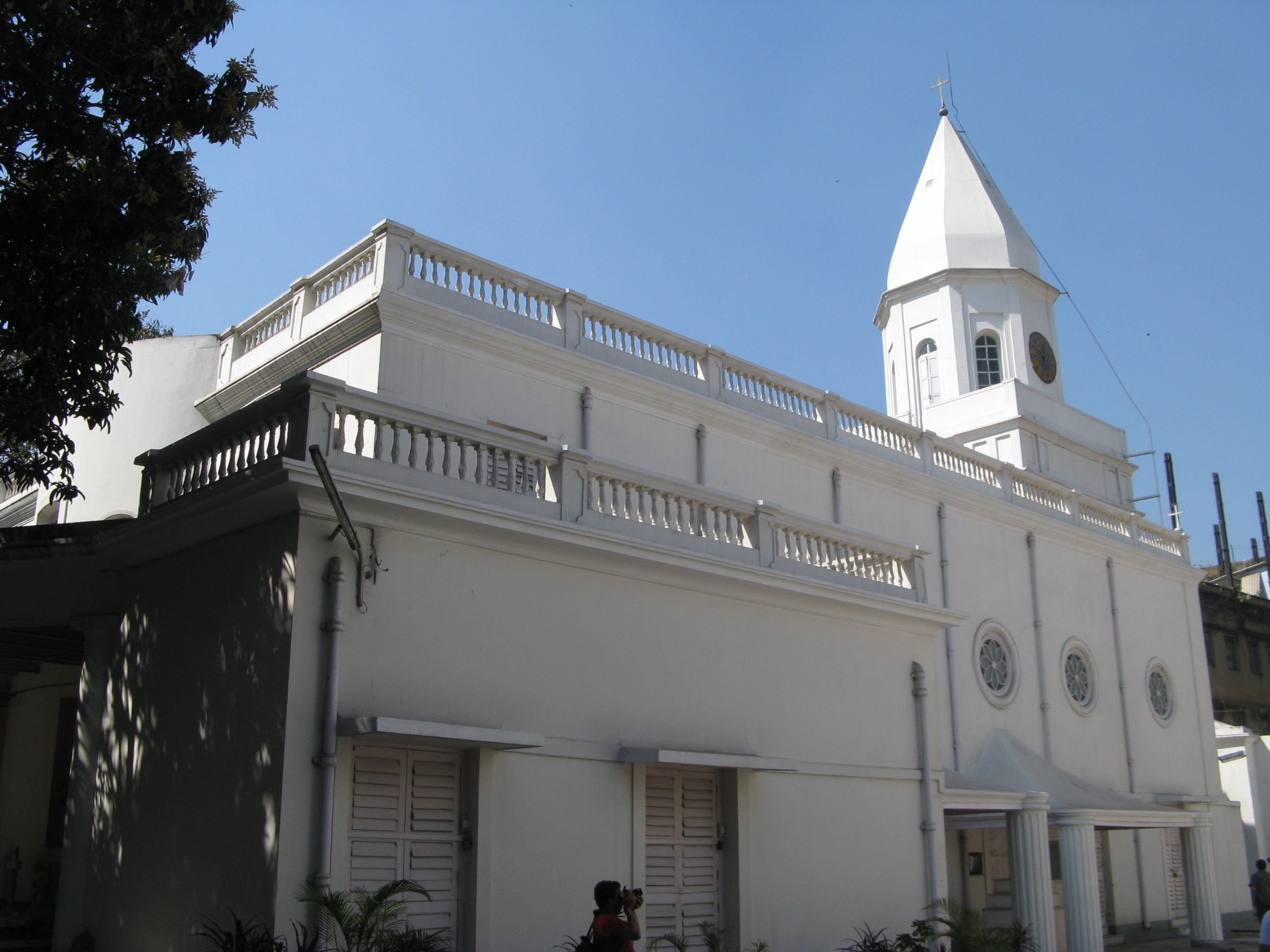
- Holy Nazareth Church, Kolkata

Religion
- Affiliation: Armenian Apostolic Church
- Rite: Armenian

Location
- Location: Burrabazar, Kolkata (Calcutta), West Bengal; India
- Interactive map of Holy Nazareth Armenian Church; Սուրբ Նազարեթ Եկեղեցի
- Coordinates: 22.5796°N 88.3514°E

Architecture
- Style: Armenian
- Completed: 1688; 338 years ago

The Armenian Holy Church of Nazareth (Armenian: Սուրբ Նազարեթ եկեղեցի) is an 18th-century Armenian Apostolic church at Kolkata (Calcutta), India, serving as the centre of the Armenian Community of Calcutta and the seat of the Armenian Vicariate of India and the Far East. It is affiliated with the Mother See of Holy Etchmiadzin of the Armenian Apostolic Church. It was first built in the year 1688 during the Mughal era and rebuilt in 1724 on the old cemetery of the Armenian community, through the efforts of Agha Nazar after the original wooden structure perished in a fire in 1707.

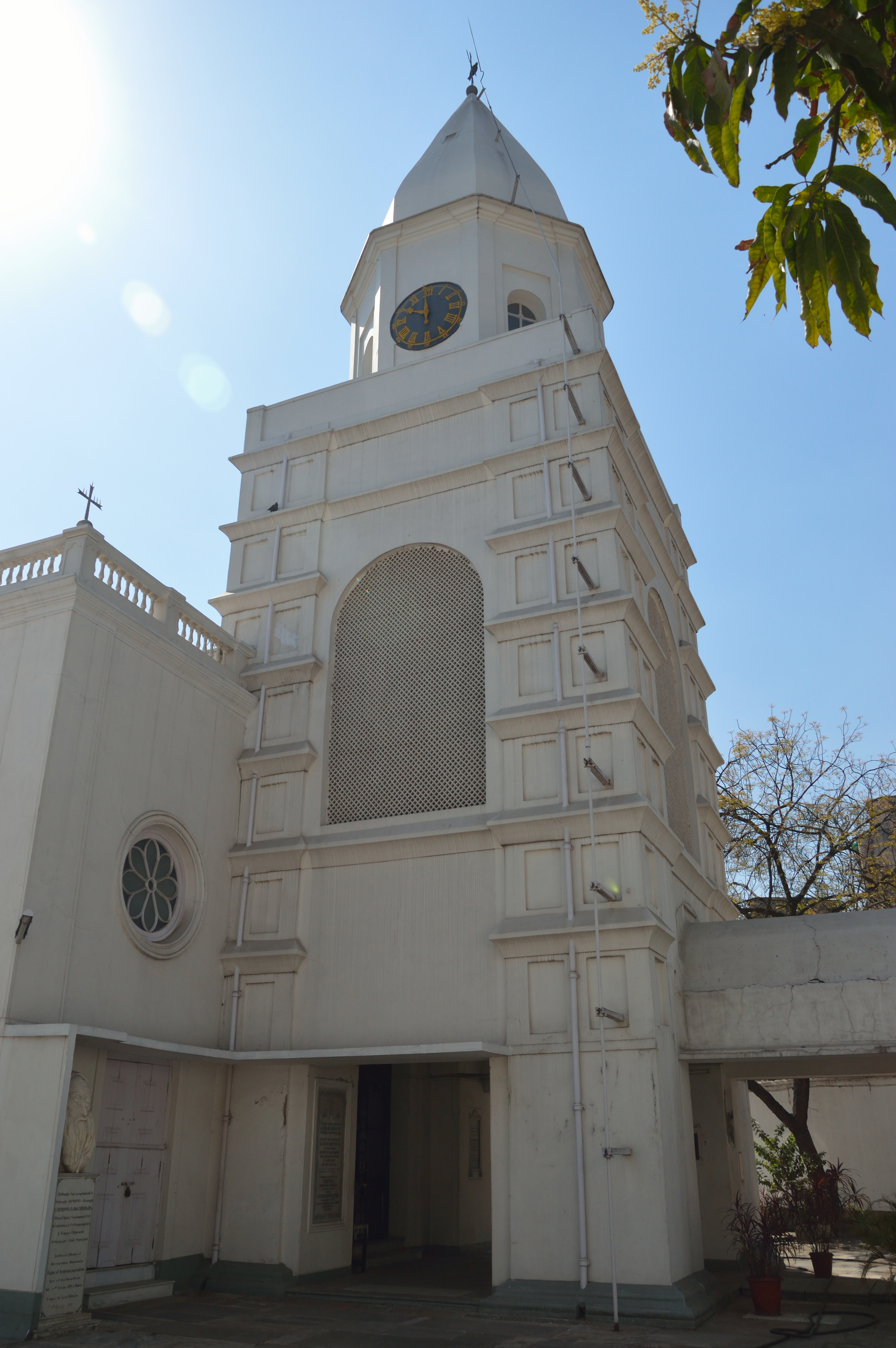
The belfry of the Holy Nazareth

== General information ==
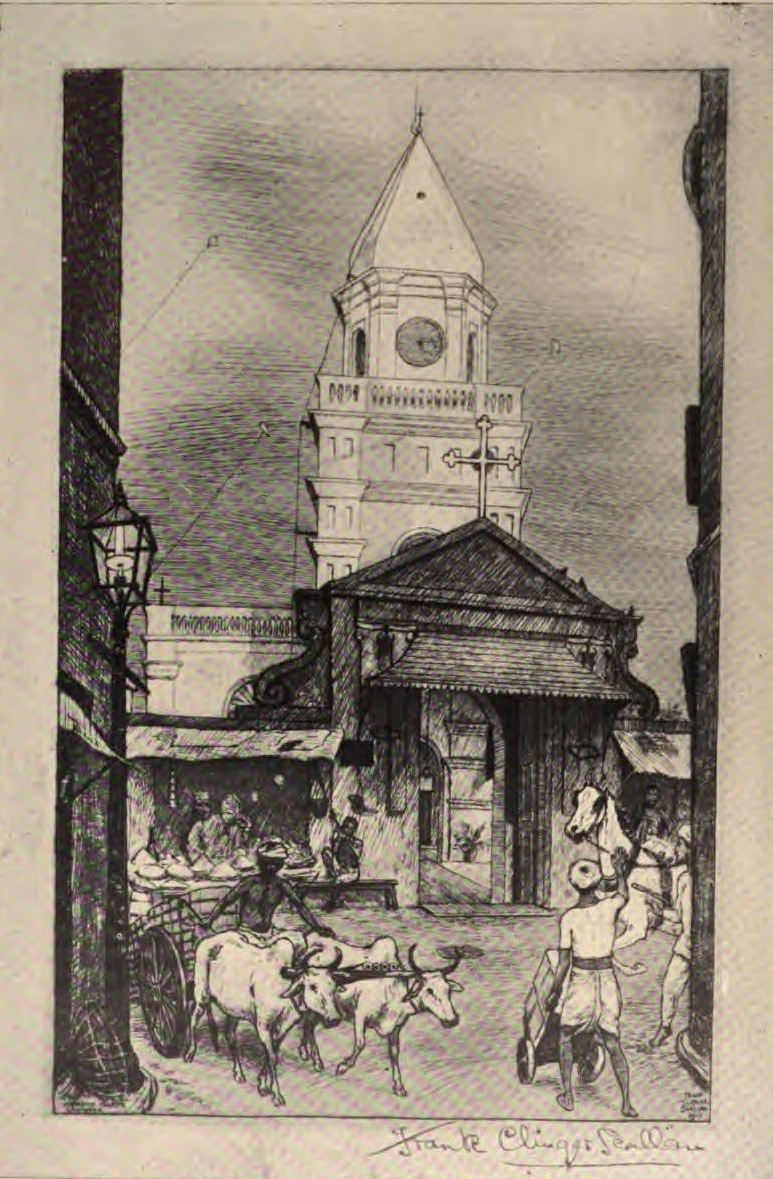
Sketch of the church in the early 20th century

The Holy Nazareth Church is located in the northwest corner of Burrabazar in the Central Kolkata area. In the years 1995 to 1997 the Calcutta Armenians applied to the Calcutta High Court to become independent of the Apostolic Church of Etchmiadzin and the High Court by order of Justice S. K. Hazari ordered that the Church and Armenian community would be independent of the Armenian Apostolic Church. It is possibly the oldest church in the Kolkata area. It was rebuilt in 1724 by Agha Jakob Nazar after a fire destroyed the previous Armenian church that had been built on the land in 1688. The first Armenians who settled in India, who were renowned merchants and traders and they built strong community structures including alms houses, chapels and schools to benefit the local Armenians. The early traders signed agreements with the British East India Company codifying their cultural, religious and trading rights. The entire Calcutta Armenian Community, barring a few, were all descendants of the Armenians of Julfa now in Iran. Very few had connections with Armenia or the Etchmiadzin Apostolic Church. Religious opinions and interventions were sought from the Church authorities of Julfa and very little or no contact was made with Etchmiadzin. The Church at no 2, Armenian St, Calcutta 700001 is known to be the oldest Christian church in Calcutta. There are two chapels. St. Mary's Chapel is situated in the Tangra area of east Calcutta. The chapel of rest of St. Gregory, also known to the local Armenians as the 'small church', is situated in the Park Circus area of Calcutta. The Armenian Churches of Calcutta are managed under High Court orders in suit no 413 of 1888 – John Gregory Apcar and others versus Thomas Malcolm and Sir Gregory Charles Paul, the Advocate General of Bengal. The Church of St. John at Chinsurah is also managed under the same order of the High Court of Calcutta in Suit no 413 of 1888. All the properties. movable and immovable, of the Armenian trusts for Calcutta Armenians are owned and managed by the government through the Official Trustee.

The cemetery, dotted with potted plants, is perhaps most famous for being the final resting place of Rezabeebeh Sookia. Her grave dates back to 1630, which makes it the oldest Christian grave in Kolkata, and proves that the arrival of the Armenians to the city predates that of the English in 1690.

The church's interior is decorated with marble. A staircase leads to a galleries section where the walls are adorned with inset frescoes and paintings. The altar in the church is adorned with a cross, the Gospel text and twelve candlesticks symbolising Jesus Christ's Twelve Apostles. The altar is also decorated with three paintings by English artist AE Harris, "Holy Trinity", "Last Supper" and "The Enshrouding of Our Lord". The Church at Armenian st was built over an Armenian graveyard and grave stones of the Calcutta Armenians surround the Church on all sides and some gravestones can even be found inside the Church.

On the east side of the Churchyard the remains of an Armenian Persian type bath can be found on a boundary wall of Hamam St.

The main Church at no. 2, Armenian St. has been used for a few services for worshippers of other Orthodox Churches such as the Syrian and Russian orthodox communities

== History ==
On 22 June 1688, the British East India Company signed a contract with the Armenians residing in India. The contract was signed by Sir Josiah Child, who represented the East India Company; and Khoja Sarhad and Khoja Fanush, who represented the Armenian community in Bengal. In accordance with the agreement, the East India Company had to build churches throughout India in areas that were inhabited by at least 40 Armenians, with the provision of 50 pounds as a salary for the priests in those churches.

In 1708, which is officially considered the founding date of the church (although 1705 and 1707 have also been given as dates by sources), the East India Company built a small wooden church on what is now the site of the southeast wing of the Church of Holy Nazareth. In 2008, it celebrated its tercentenary. Later, an Armenian named Aga Nazar (Jakob Nazar) raised money and built the church in 1724. The present church building was built in 1764 by Aga Mamed Hazar Maliyar on land donated by an Armenian named Kenanentekh Phanoosh, and was designed by Kavond (or Hevond) from Persia.

The interior of the church was designed by Catchick Arakiel. Arakiel also built a monastery for priests and erected a high wall around the cemetery. In addition, he donated a clock to be fitted in the church structure. In 1790, Catchick Arakiel attached a room to the clergy and set the clock on the belfry. The expensively decorated interiors, including a combination of black and white marble, were placed with the support of wealthy Armenians, such as Sir Catchick Paul Chater. The outer buildings were all built at the expense of wealthy Calcutta Armenians such as Arathoon Stephen, builder and owner of the world-famous Calcutta Grand Hotel.

== See also ==
- Armenians in India
- Elihu Yale
- Paul Chater (born Khachik Pogose Astwachatoor)- Indian born Hong Kong-Armenian businessman who left the residue of his estate to the Calcutta Armenian Church after his death in 1926
- Old Mission Church, Kolkata
