= Arathoon Stephen =

Armenian hotelier and developer

Arathoon Stephen (Armenian: Արաթուն Սթիվեն; 1861 – 14 May 1927) was an Armenian hotelier and real estate developer based in British India. Amongst other properties, he owned and developed the Empire Theatre and Grand Hotel in Calcutta (modern day Kolkata).

Born in Isfahan, Iran in 1861, Stephen arrived in Calcutta sometime in the nineteenth century where he first began selling jewelry from a wheelbarrow. Later, he opened a jewelry and antique shop at 18 Chowringhee Road and the Theatre Royale at No. 16. In 1911, he bought out a run-down boarding house run by Mrs. Annie Monk and built the Grand Hotel. Stephen also owned several other properties in Calcutta, many of which now have heritage status, including Queens Mansion (which houses the Armenian Club of Calcutta), Stephen Court, Stephen House and the Empire Theatre. He also built and owned the Everest Hotel in Darjeeling. Stephen died on 14 May 1927.
