= Grand Hotel (Kolkata) =

Hotel in Kolkata, India

Oberoi Grand

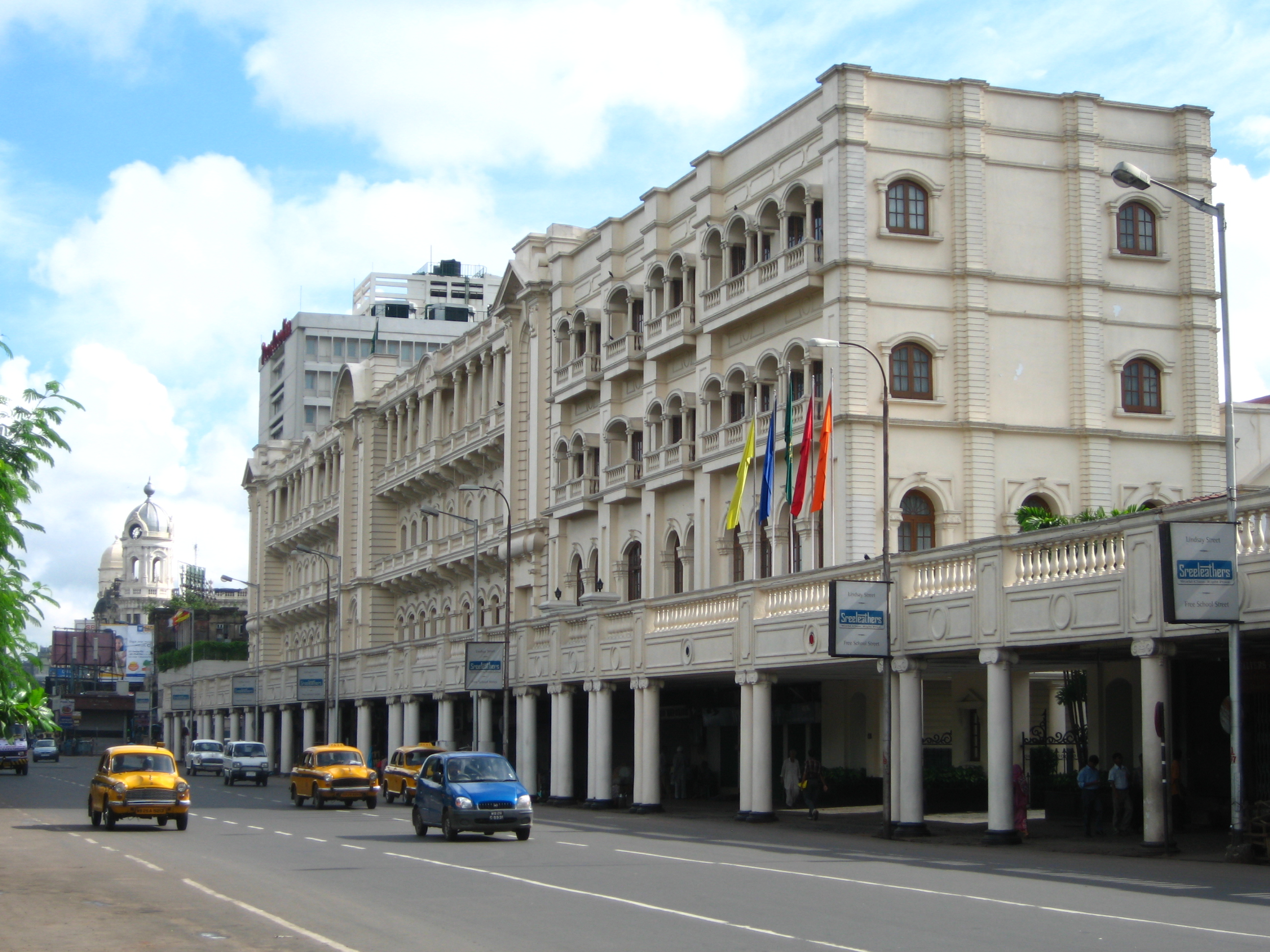
- The Oberoi Grand Hotel
- Former names: Grand Hotel

General information
- Location: Chowringhee, Central Kolkata, 15, Chowringhee Road, Kolkata, India
- Coordinates: 22°33′40.42″N 88°20′56.46″E
- Construction started: Late 19th century
- Owner: Oberoi Hotels & Resorts

The Grand Hotel, now known as the Oberoi Grand, is situated in the heart of Kolkata on Chowringhee Road. It is an elegant building of British era and is a famous building in Kolkata. The hotel is now owned by EIH Ltd. Oberoi chain of hotels.

== History ==
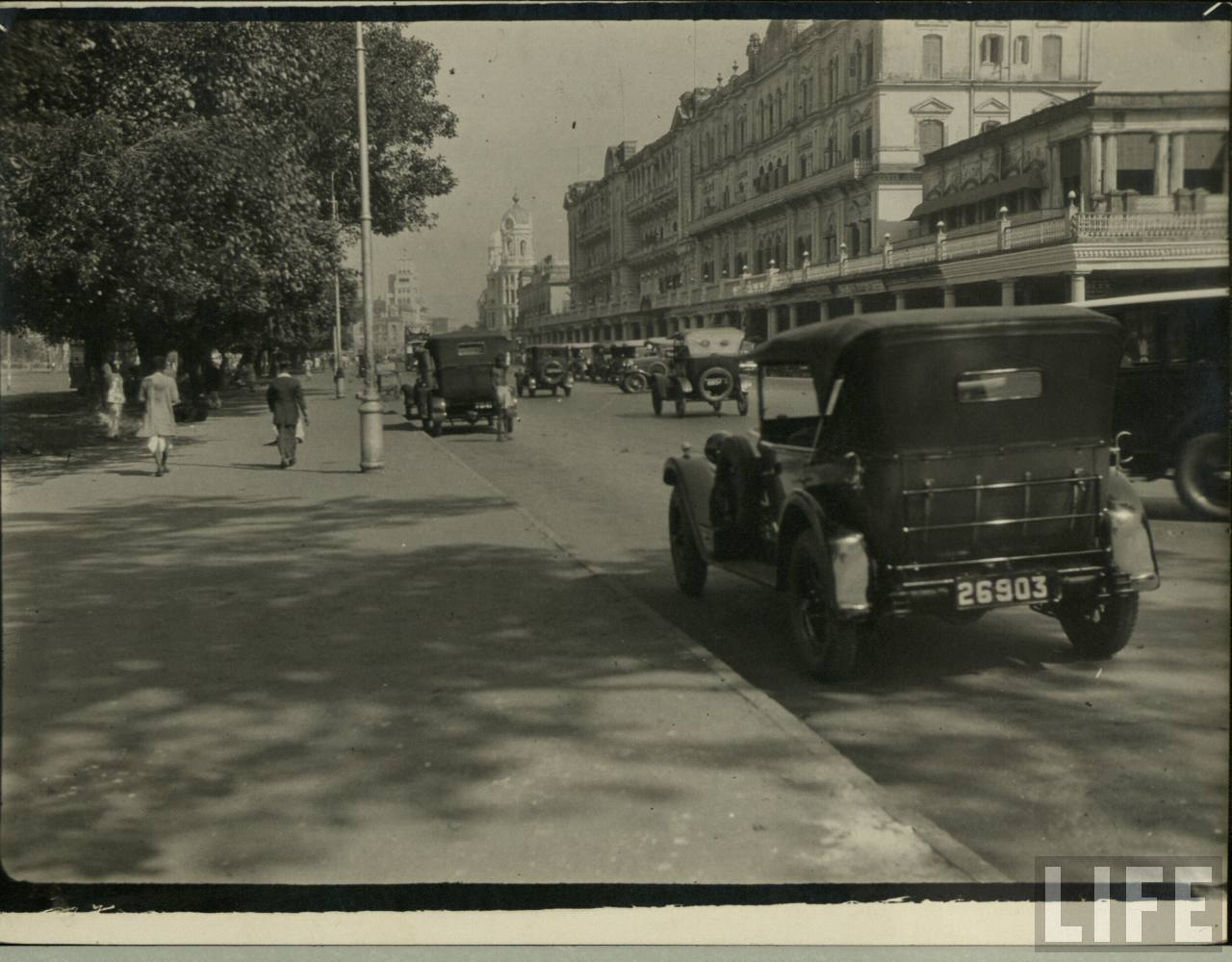
Old Chowringhee Road in front of Grand Hotel (Calcutta)

The house was converted into a boarding house by Mrs. Annie Monk who later expanded her business to include Numbers 14, 15 and 17. 16 Chowringhee was occupied by a theatre owned and managed by Arathoon Stephen, an Armenian from Isfahan. When, in 1911, the theatre burned down, Stephen bought out Mrs. Monk and, over time, redeveloped the site into what now makes up the modern hotel. Built in an extravagant neoclassical style, the hotel soon became a popular spot amongst the English population of Calcutta. It was known, in particular, for its annual New Year party that, along with iced champagne and expensive gifts, involved the release of twelve piglets in the ballroom. Anyone who caught a piglet, could keep it.

In the 1930s, sometime after the death of Stephen, a typhoid epidemic in Calcutta resulted in the death of six people at the hotel. The drainage system at the hotel was suspected and it was closed in 1937. The property was leased by Mohan Singh Oberoi who reopened the hotel in 1939 and was able to buy the property outright in 1943.

The hotel got a major lift during World War II when about 4000 soldiers were billeted there, and would party regularly. Events like the U.S. Marines' Ball at the hotel remind visitors of such times.

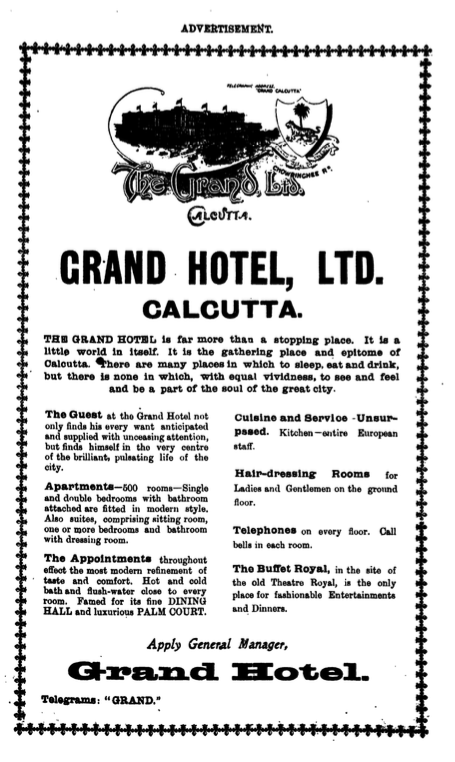
Old advertisement of hotel

== Features ==
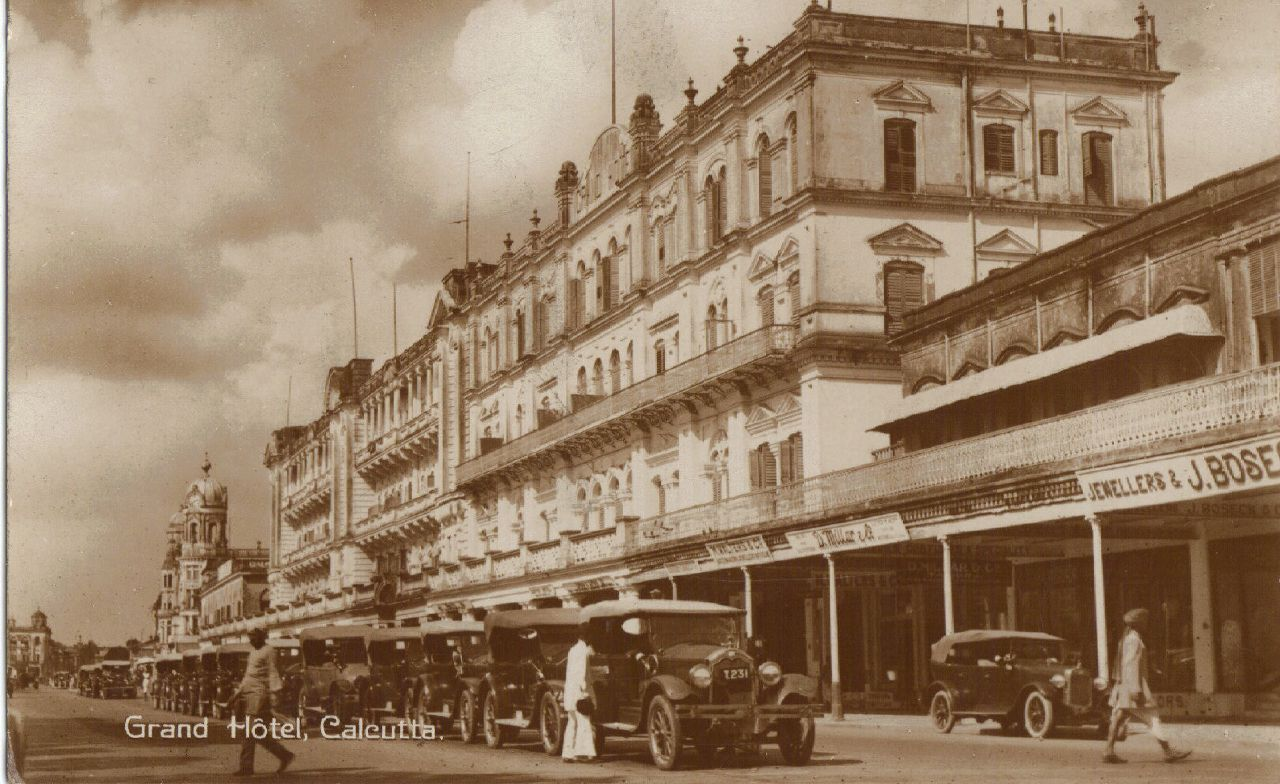
Grand Hotel (Calcutta) in 1930s

The hotel features a neoclassical style. The five‑storey block is arranged around a central light well and landscaped courtyard, ensuring natural ventilation and daylight. Inside, the ground‑floor lobby retains original mosaic flooring and teak paneling, while the Grande Ballroom with its ornate cornices, crystal chandeliers, and sprung dance floor has hosted celebrations ranging from state banquets to charity balls. The Oberoi Grand, Kolkata, was honoured on 10 May 2024 with the Indian National Trust for Art and Cultural Heritage’s blue cultural plaque, recognising its century‑long heritage as the “Grande Dame of Chowringhee” and its role in Kolkata's architectural and social history

== Gallery ==
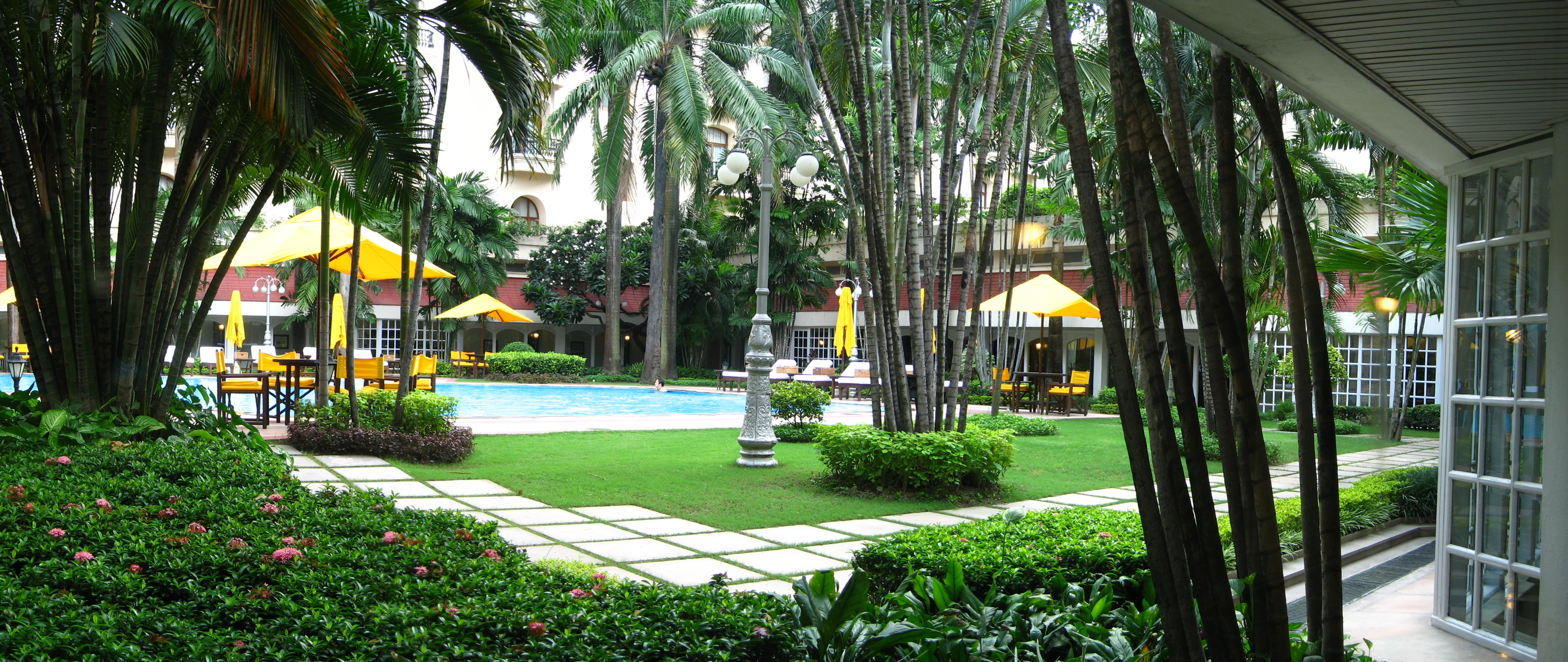
The Interior Courtyard of Grand Hotel (Kolkata)

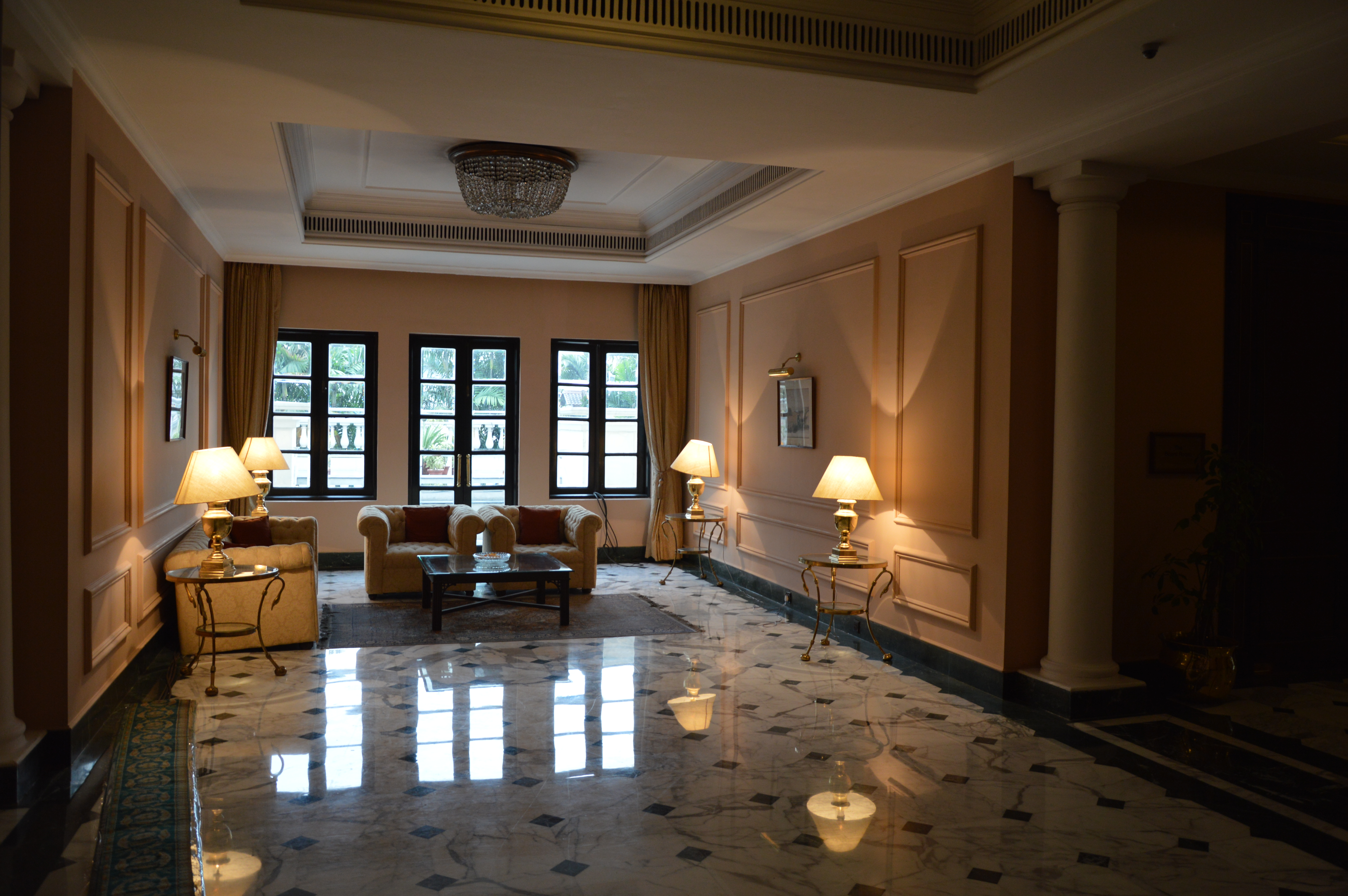
First Floor Lounge of Grand Hotel (Kolkata)

Ball Room of Grand Hotel (Kolkata)

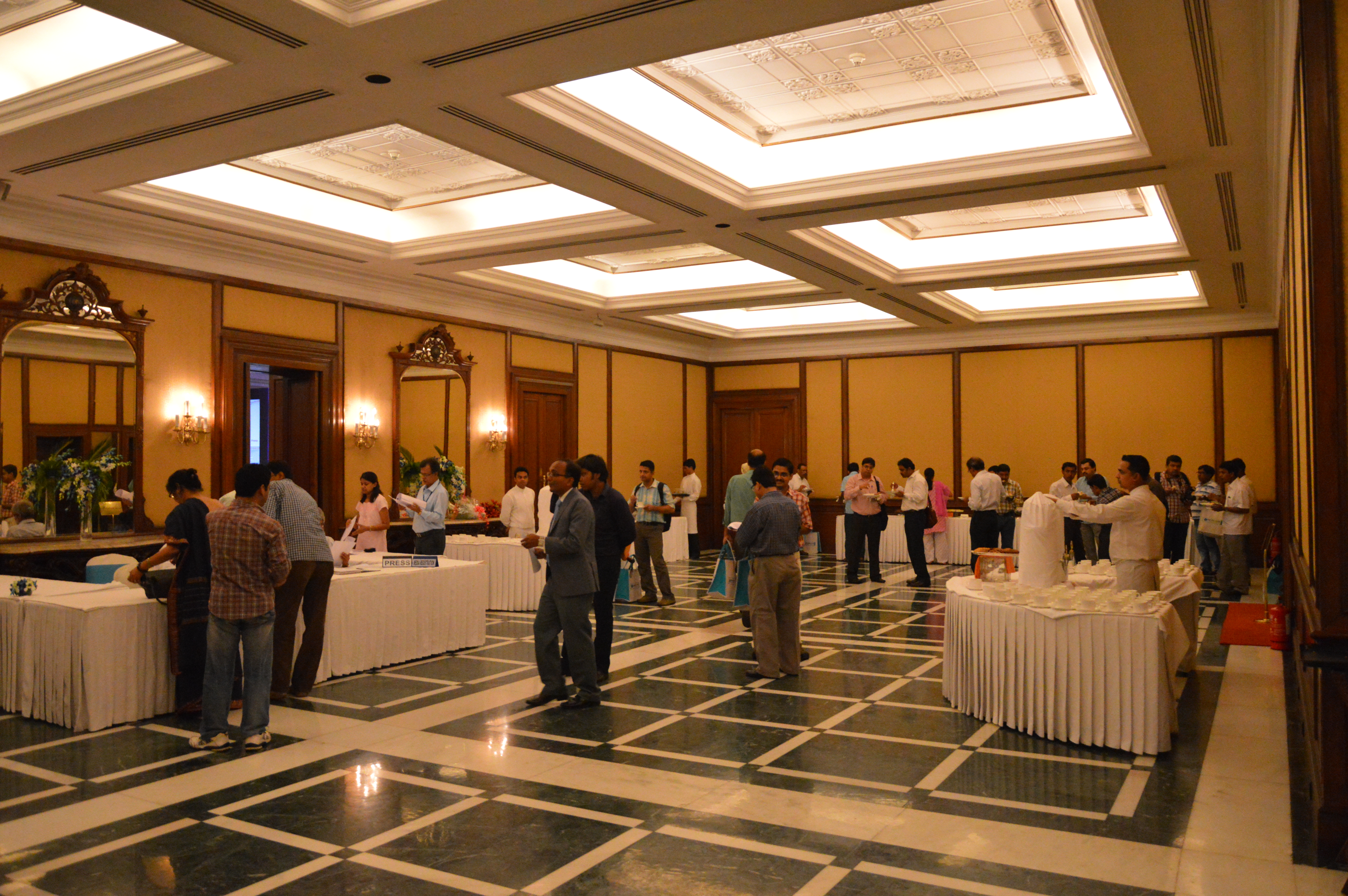
Ball Room Lobby of Grand Hotel (Kolkata)
