= Seydi, Iran =

Seydi صیدی
- Village
- Location within Iran
- Coordinates: 27°50′31″N 52°18′31″E
- Country: Iran
- Province: Bushehr
- County: Jam
- Bakhsh: Central
- Rural District: Jam

Population (2006)
  - Total: 482
- Time zone: UTC+3:30 (IRST)
  - Summer (DST): UTC+4:30 (IRDT)

Seydi (Persian: صیدی, also Romanized as Şeydī, Şayādī, and Şayyādī; also known as Şeyd and Şayyād) is a village in Jam Rural District, in the Central District of Jam County, Bushehr province, Iran. At the 2006 census, its population was 482, in 100 families.
