= Coja Petrus Uscan =

Armenian merchant (c. 1680–1751)

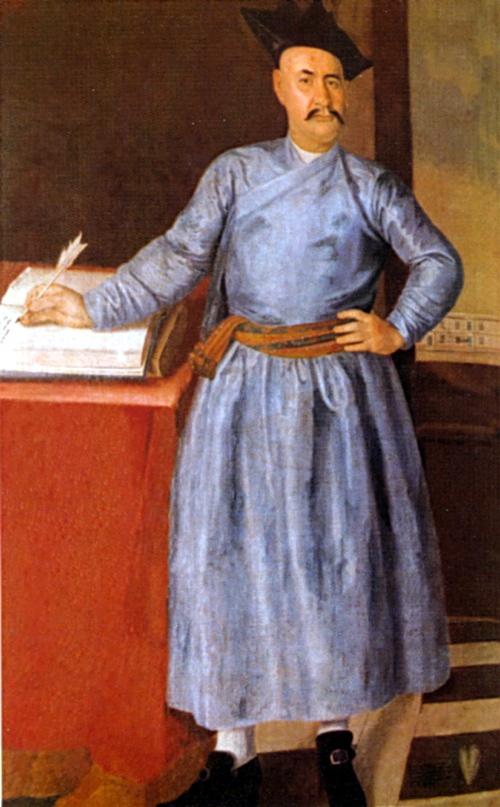
- Painting of Coja Petrus Uscan
- Born: 18th century New Julfa, Safavid Iran
- Died: 18th century Madras (Chennai), India
- Occupations: Merchant, community leader
- Known for: Prominent Armenian merchant in Madras and benefactor to the Armenian community
- Notable work: Patronage of Armenian churches and community institutions in Madras

Coja Petrus Uscan (also Woskan, Voskan, 1680/81 – 1751) was an Armenian merchant and leader of the Armenian community of Madras (a city now part of India) who was known for his immense wealth and unflinching devotion and loyalty to the British during the French occupation of Madras.

== Ancestry and early life ==
Petrus Uscan was born in a family of prominent Armenian traders which had traded with the East for generations. His grandfather Coja Pogus (Paul) had been buried in Julfa. Very little is known of his early life except for the fact that he migrated to Madras in the year 1723 and settled in the city for the rest of his life.

== Assumption of monopoly ==
As soon as Uscan arrived in Madras, the Nawab of the Carnatic visited Madras and Uscan lavished hospitality upon him. A pleased Nawab offered gifts and titles and sole monopoly of trade in Madras.

== Endowments ==
Petrus Uscan donated lavishly for Christian religious endowments. He was one of the foremost contributors to the construction of St Rita's church in St Thome. A slab on the east wall of the church has the inscription "In memory of the Armenian nation, 1729". In April, the very same year, the grave of St Thomas was opened for public viewing. Uscan was among those present.

== Construction of Marmalong Bridge ==
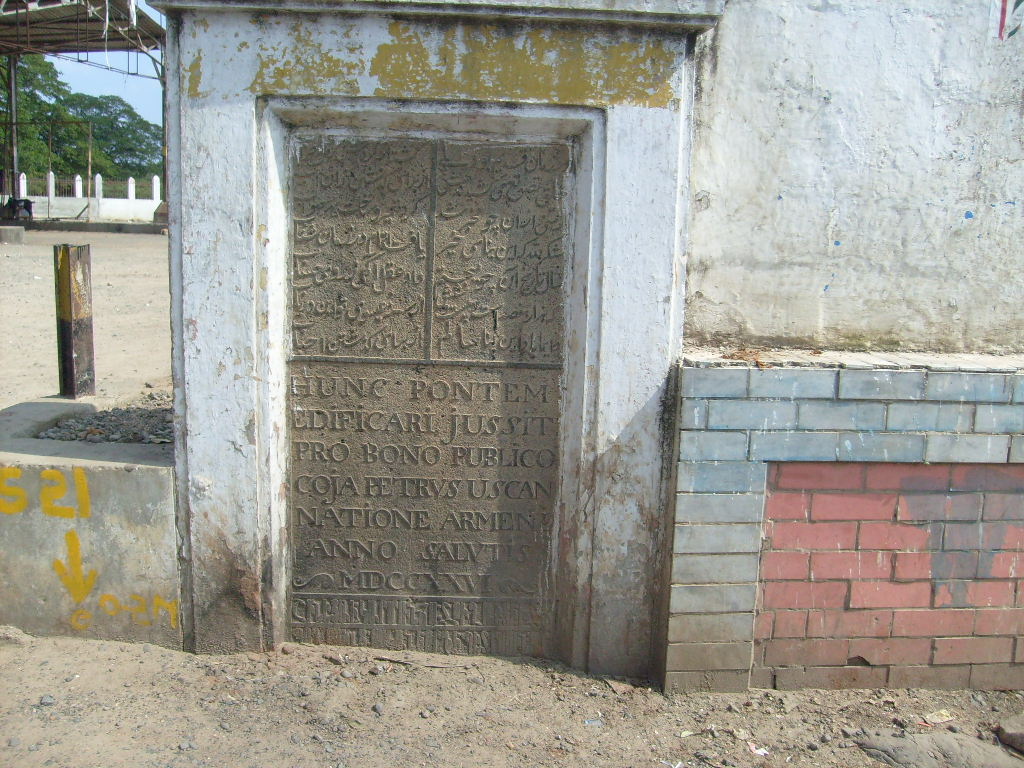
A marble plaque with multinlingual inscriptions in Persian, Latin and Armenian on the northern edge of the Marmalong Bridge adjoining the Saidapet Bus Stand commemorate the construction of the first-ever Marmalong Bridge across the Adyar River.

In 1728, Coja Petrus Uscan constructed the Marmalong Bridge across the Adyar River. It cost him 30,000 pagodas. Still, he paid the full amount and also donated 1,500 pagodas for the bridge's upkeep.

The bridge no longer exists today, having been replaced by a second bridge. However, the bridge built by Uscan is the first ever bridge built across the Adyar.

In 1726, he constructed the steps which led to the Catholic shrine atop St Thomas Mount which still bears a slab commemorating Uscan's legacy. He also donated 1,500 pagodas for the maintenance of the steps.

== In service of the British East India Company ==
=== As Company Councillor ===
Uscan was appointed Company Councillor for the British East India Company. Uscan performed well in his newfound role, occasionally serving as the Company's envoy. In 1740, when the Raghuji Bhonsle of Nagpur invaded the Carnatic, Petrus Uscan was appointed the British envoy to negotiate peace with the Maratha general. Uscan negotiated with the Marathas and impressed the general so much that he even recognized British rule over Tiruchirappalli, Madras and Fort St David. On another occasion, Petrus Uscan succeeded in obtaining exclusive rights for the British of Madras to mint coins in their own name.

=== During French occupation ===
When the French occupied Madras in 1746, they seized Petrus Uscan's belongings and carried them off to Pondicherry. Uscan fled Madras and sought refuge in a Danish ship. Dupleix, then the governor of French India, offered him French protection and restoration of confiscated property in the name of the Capuchin chapel of Madras Armenians if Uscan shifted his loyalty to the French. However, Uscan gave a defiant reply that the Armenian tradition was to remain loyal to one's benefactors.

== Later life ==
When Madras reverted to British control in 1749, Petrus Uscan and one Mrs. Madeiros were the only Catholics permitted to reside in the Fort. Following the reestablishment of British rule over Madras, the Capuchin chapel in the Fort was destroyed by the British who felt that the chief Armenian priest had spied for the French. Petrus managed to retain Armenian hold over the Chapel of Our Lady of Miracles in Vepery for some time. But after his death, it was made over to Protestants and a suitable compensation provided to the Armenian community which previously owned it.

== Death ==
Petrus Uscan died in 1751 and was buried in the Chapel of Our Lady of Miracles, which he owned. On Protestant occupation of the site in the middle of the 18th century, they built an Anglican church over it. Petrus Uscan's tombstone was however left untouched and it remains to this day. There is a commemorative plaque in his name at the Marmalong bridge and the Armenian church in Chennai to this day.

== Legacy ==
The Armenian community of Madras gained prominence in the 17th century AD and exercised a significant amount of power and domination over early Madras till the middle of the 19th century. Coja Petrus Uscan who led the Armenian community of Madras from 1723 to 1751 is regarded as the greatest and most famous member of the community. The community has almost become extinct, yet its memory survives through Petrus Uscan's numerous endowments and works of charity.
