= Armenians in Myanmar =

Ethnic group in Myanmar

Total population
- >1,000

Regions with significant populations
- Arakan, Tanintharyi

Languages
- Armenian

Religion
- Armenian Apostolic Church

The first Armenians in Myanmar were merchants who arrived in 1612, and settled in Syriam, where the first Armenian tombstone is dated 1725.

Frontier Myanmar reported the number of Armenians "a few hundred at most" in 2019. According to Reverend John Felix, priest at the Armenian church in Yangon, the last full Armenian died in 2013, but there are "no more than 10 or 20 families who are part Armenian."

== History ==
Armenians were deported in large numbers to New Julfa, on the outskirts of Isfahan (Persia), early in the seventeenth century. Many continued to South and Southeast Asia in the eighteenth century as conditions turned against them in Persia. By the 19th century they were chiefly in Burma, the Malay Peninsula (particularly Penang and Malacca), and Java. They emigrated further from around World War I, notably to Australia.

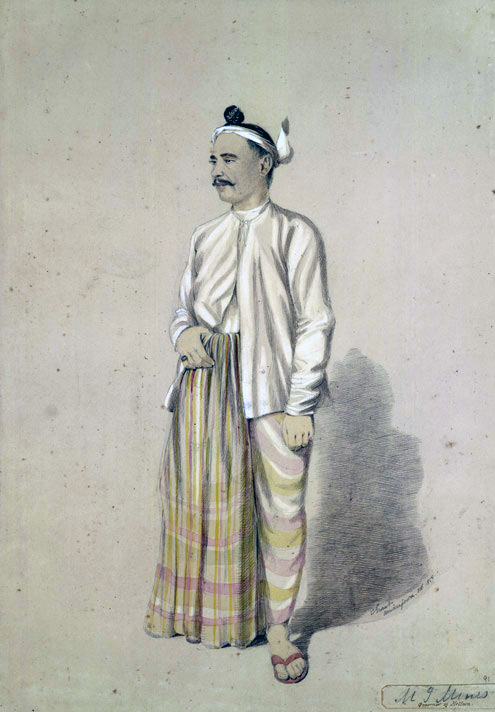
Mackertich J. Mines, governor of Melun in the Konbaung era, was an Armenian.

In Burma, major Armenian traders were employed as officials by the Burmese kings, especially in charge of customs and relations with foreigners. They survived the First Burmese War in 1826, when the British annexed Arakan and Tenasserim, but the British conquest of Lower Burma, the commercial heart of the country, in 1852, led to renewed accusations (from the British) that Armenian merchants were anti-British, and even pro-Russian. Nevertheless, the Armenians of Yangon built their church in 1862, on land presented to them by the King of Burma.

The 1871-1872 Census of British India said that there were 1,250 Armenians, chiefly in Kolkata, Dhaka and Yangon. The 1881 Census stated the figure to be 1,308; 737 in Bengal and 466 in Burma. By 1891, the total figure was 1,295. The 1901 Census of British India stated that there were 256 Armenians in Burma.

As of 2014 the only Armenian Apostolic Church still active was St. John the Baptist in Yangon.

== Notable Armenians ==
The Sarkies Brothers (four Armenian brothers who founded a chain of hotels throughout Southeast Asia) first opened the Eastern & Oriental Hotel in Penang in 1884 before expanding their business to the Raffles Hotel in Singapore and The Strand Hotel in Yangon in 1901. Another Burmese Armenian is Diana Abgar.

Ba Maw, Premier of British Burma in 1937–39 and dictator of the State of Burma in 1943–45, who was reportedly of partial Armenian descent. Min wrote that it was a rumor, "strengthened by the fact that one Thaddeus, an Armenian, occasionally visited the two boys in school on behalf of the mother" and that he had a "complexion much fairer than that of most of the Anglo-Burman boys" at his school. "It seems, however, that both their parents were of pure Talaing blood."

== See also ==
- Armenian diaspora
