= William Wright (orientalist) =

English orientalist and professor (1830–1889)

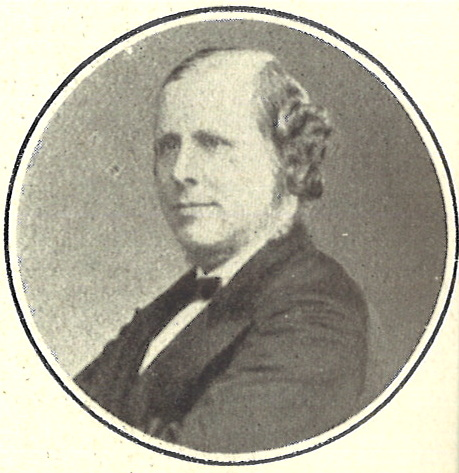
William Wright

William Wright (17 January 1830 – 22 May 1889) was a famous English Orientalist, and Professor of Arabic in the University of Cambridge. Many of his works on Syriac literature are still in print and of considerable scholarly value, especially the catalogues of the holdings of the British Library and Cambridge University Library. A Grammar of The Arabic Language, often simply known as Wright's Grammar, continues to be a popular book with students of Arabic. Wright is also remembered for the Short history of Syriac literature.

== Life ==
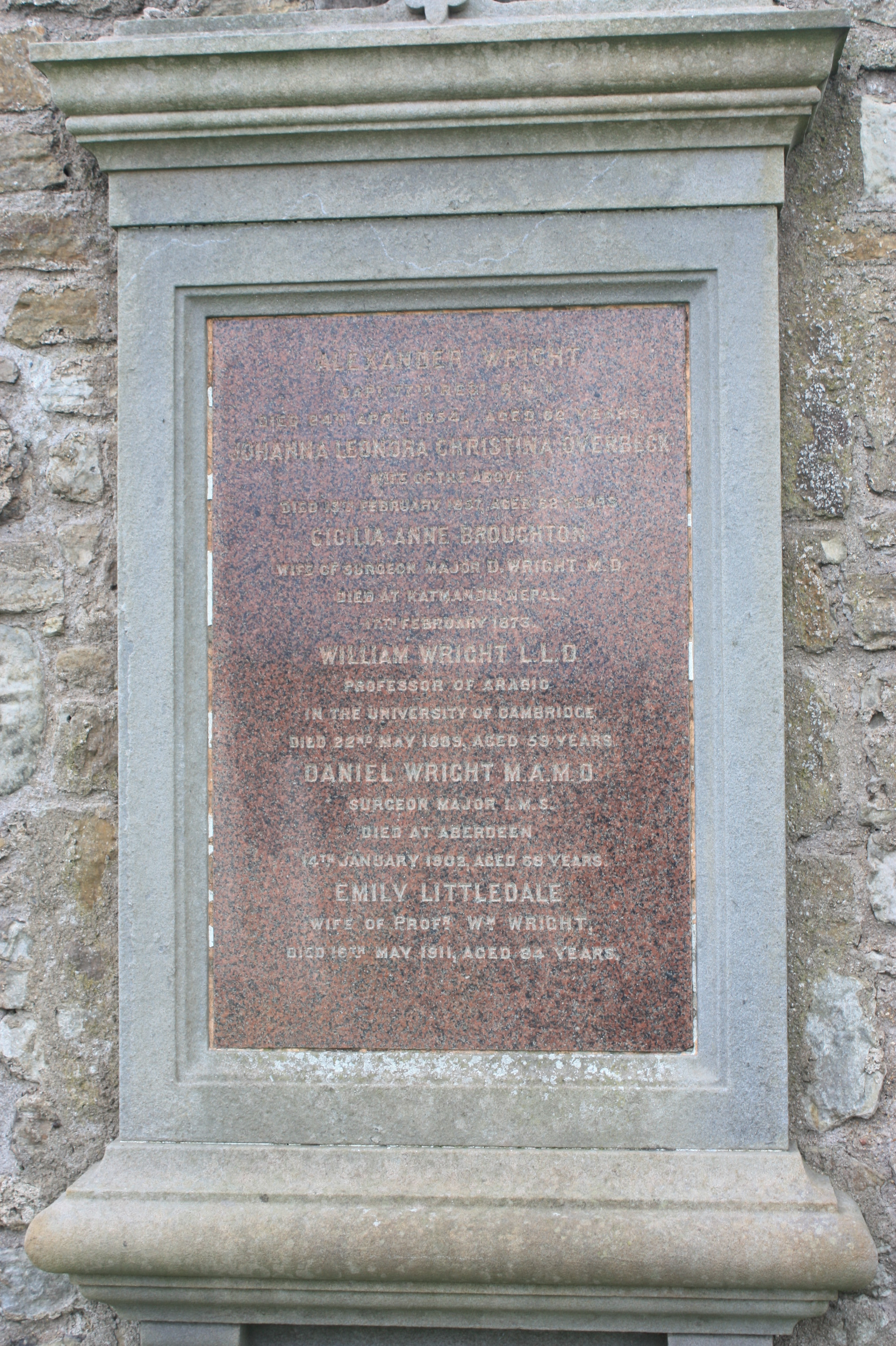
The grave of Prof William Wright, St Andrews Cathedral churchyard

Wright was born in Bengal to Alexander Wright and Johanna Leonora Christina Overbeek, daughter of the last resident of Dutch Bengal, Daniel Anthony Overbeek. He was educated at St Andrew's University, Halle and Leiden. He was Professor of Arabic at University College London from 1855 to 1856, and Professor of Arabic at Trinity College, Dublin from 1856 to 1861.

From 1861 to 1869 he was an Assistant in the Department of Manuscripts at the British Museum, and from 1869 to 1870 Assistant Keeper at the museum. In 1870 he was appointed Sir Thomas Adams's Professor of Arabic at Cambridge University, and he held the chair there until his death in 1889.

On death he was returned to St Andrews for burial. His grave lies against the eastern wall of St Andrew's Cathedral churchyard, backing onto the Eastern Cemetery.

== Works ==
Letter by Wright (1887)

His early publications of Syriac material appeared in the Journal of Sacred Literature in the 1860s. These included the publication of the Syriac text of An ancient Syrian martyrology in the October 1865 issue.

He then went on to publish texts and translations of various works listed below. He also translated and edited Caspari's Grammar of the Arabic Language (2 vols., London, 1859–62); collected and edited Opuscula Arabica (Leyden, 1859).

His main achievement was as a cataloguer of manuscript collections. The rich Syriac holdings of the British Museum (now in the British Library) were mainly obtained in the 1840s from the monastery of Deir al'Syriani in the Nitrian desert in Egypt and contained a large number of previously unknown texts. Wright's catalogue included excerpts from unpublished texts, and is still a valuable reference even today. He also compiled a similarly valuable catalogue of the Cambridge University Library collection. The manuscripts in this collection came mainly from Anglican Missionaries based at Urmiah.

His Short history of Syriac literature was written originally as an encyclopedia article, and so has no proper sub-divisions. It was republished after his death in book form, and has remained a basic handbook for the student of Syriac. The material in it comes from various sources, but much of it from the Chronicum Ecclesiasticum of Bar Hebraeus, of which no English translation exists.

A bibliography of his work can be found by R. L. Benaly, in Journal of the Royal Asiatic Society, 1889, pp. 708 and following. There is also an entry in the Dictionary of National Biography.

== Publications ==
- The book of Jonah in four semitic versions : Chaldee, Syriac, Aethiopic and Arabic. London, (1857).
- Contributions to the apocryphal literature of the New Testament / collected and edited from Syriac manuscripts in the British Museum, with an English translation and notes, by W. Wright. (1865).
- The departure of my Lady Mary from this world / edited from two Syriac MSS. in the British Museum, and translated by W. Wright. (1865) (Journal of sacred literature and Biblical record for January and April, 1865).
- Wright, William (1867). "Two Epistles of Mār Jacob, Bishop of Edessa". Journal of Sacred Literature and Biblical Record. New Series. 10: 430–460.
- The homilies of Aphraates, the Persian sage / [by] Aphraates, the Persian sage. (1869) Syriac text only.
- A Grammar of The Arabic Language. (London), Simon Wallenberg Press, Vol-1 & Vol-2 ISBN 1-84356-028-3.
- Catalogue of Syriac Manuscripts in The British Museum acquired since the year 1838 (1870), 3 vols: vol. 1, vol. 2, vol. 3.
- Apocryphal Acts of the Apostles / edited from Syriac manuscripts in the British Museum and other libraries by William Wright. (1871). In 2 vols, Syriac and English.
- Wright, William (1871). Fragments of the Turrāṣ mamllā nahrāyā or Syriac Grammar of Jacob of Edessa. London: Gilbert and Rivington.
- Fragments of the Curetonian Gospels [in Syriac] / ed. by W. Wright. (1872).
- Fragments of the Homilies of Cyril of Alexandria on the Gospel of S. Luke (1874).
- The chronicle of Joshua the stylite : composed in Syriac A.D. 507. With a translation into English and notes by W. Wright (1882).
- S. Ignatius. Revised texts with introductions, notes, dissertations, and translations. Gr., Lat., Eng.-Syriac remains of S. Ignatius. (1885).
- Some apocryphal Psalms in Syriac. Proceedings of the Society of Biblical Archaeology, June 1887.
- The book of Kalilah and Dimnah / translated from Arabic into Syriac (1884) Syriac only.
- Lectures on the Comparative Grammar of the Semitic Languages (Cambridge, 1890)* A short history of Syriac literature (1894).
- Epistolae Pilati et Herodis graece. (W. Wright's translation of the Syriac version.) Gr. & Eng. (1897).
- Ecclesiastical history of Eusebius in Syriac / edited from the manuscripts by William Wright and Norman McLean, with a collation of the ancient Armenian version by Adalbert Merx; translated from the Greek by C.F.Crusé. (1898) Syriac text only.
- A Catalogue of the Syriac manuscripts preserved in the library of the University of Cambridge. By William Wright & Stanley Arthur Cook. (1901).

== Literature ==
- Bernhard Maier: Semitic Studies in Victorian Britain. A portrait of William Wright and his world through his letters. Würzburg 2011.
- Pierre Larcher, « L’étrange destin d’un livre : la soi-disant Grammaire arabe de William Wright (1830-1889) », Historiographia Linguistica 41/1, p. 109-126, 2014.
