= Dutch settlement in Rajshahi =

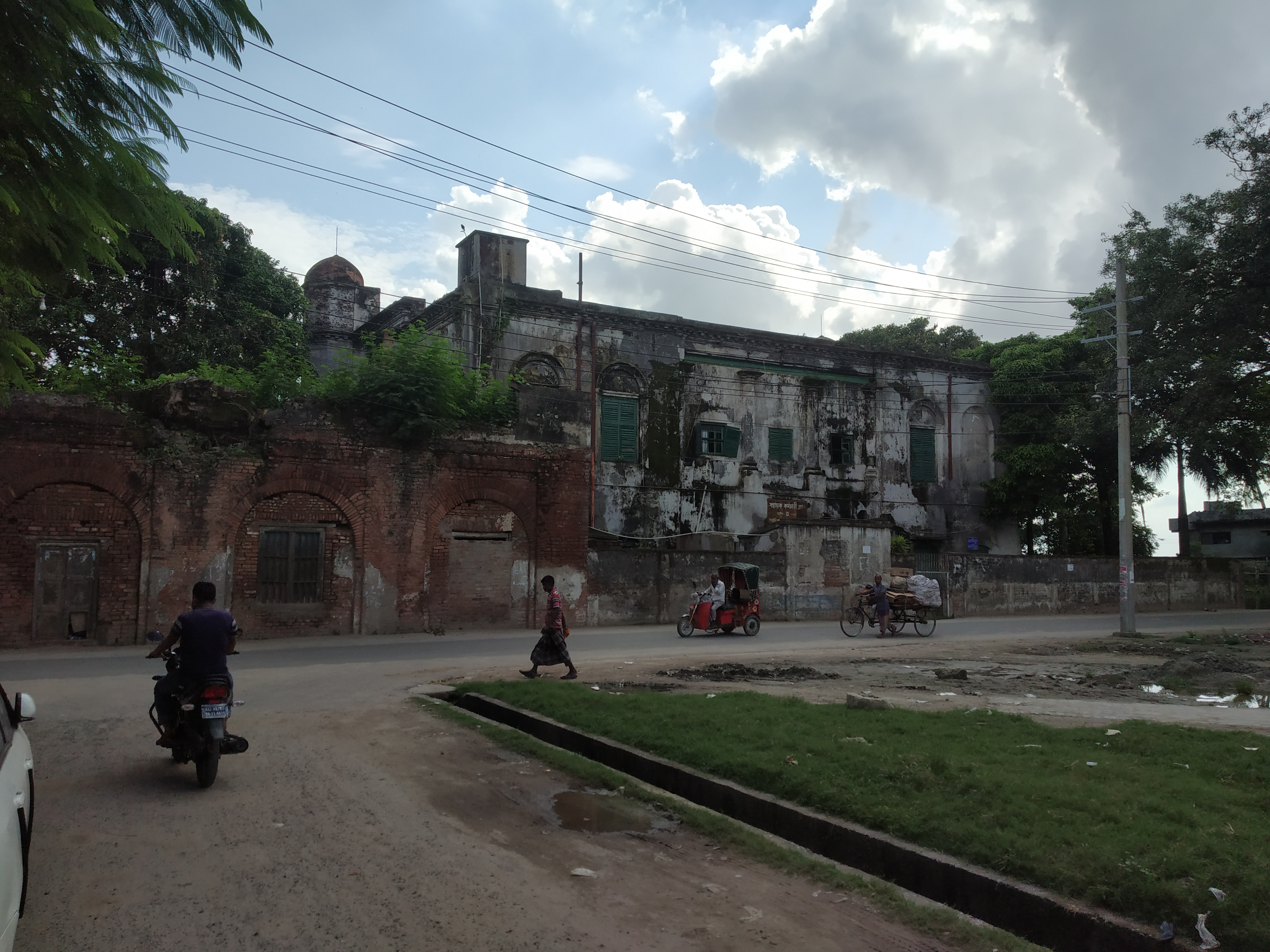
Boro Kuthi

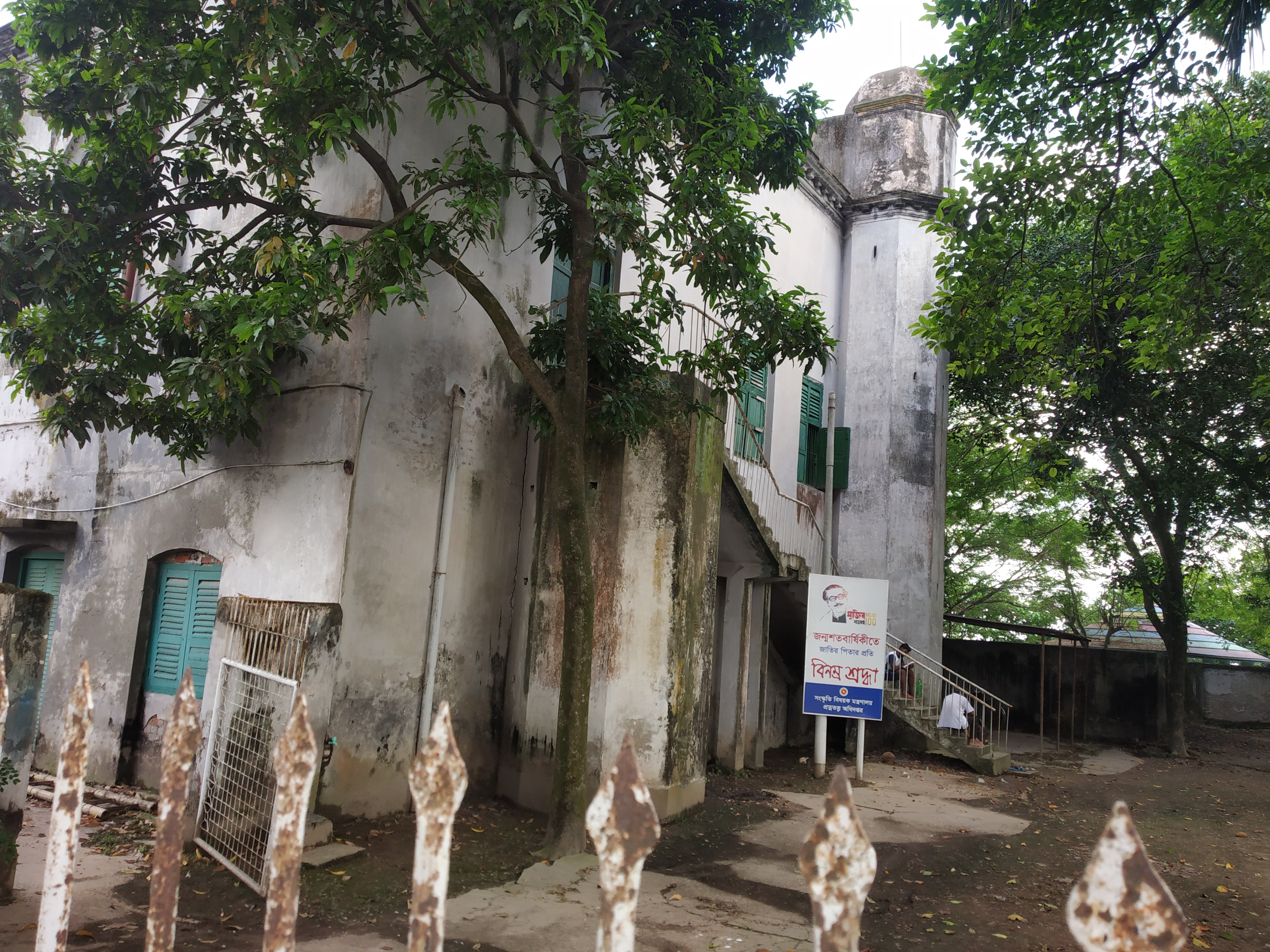
Dutch settlement in Rajshahi

VOC flag

A trading post of the Dutch East India Company (VOC) existed in Rajshahi, Bengal, during the 18th century. The Dutch were the first Europeans to arrive in this area. The trading station was located on the banks of the Padma River. It included factories for silk and indigo production. The Dutch silk factory located in the Boro Kuthi still stands on the riverbank as an important landmark. The settlement was built in 1781. It was part of the Dutch Bengal department. It later passed to the control of the British East India Company.

The campus of the University of Rajshahi is located on the site of the old Dutch settlement.

== See also ==
- Boro Kuthi
- Dutch Bengal
- Portuguese settlement in Chittagong
