= Daniel Anthony Overbeek =

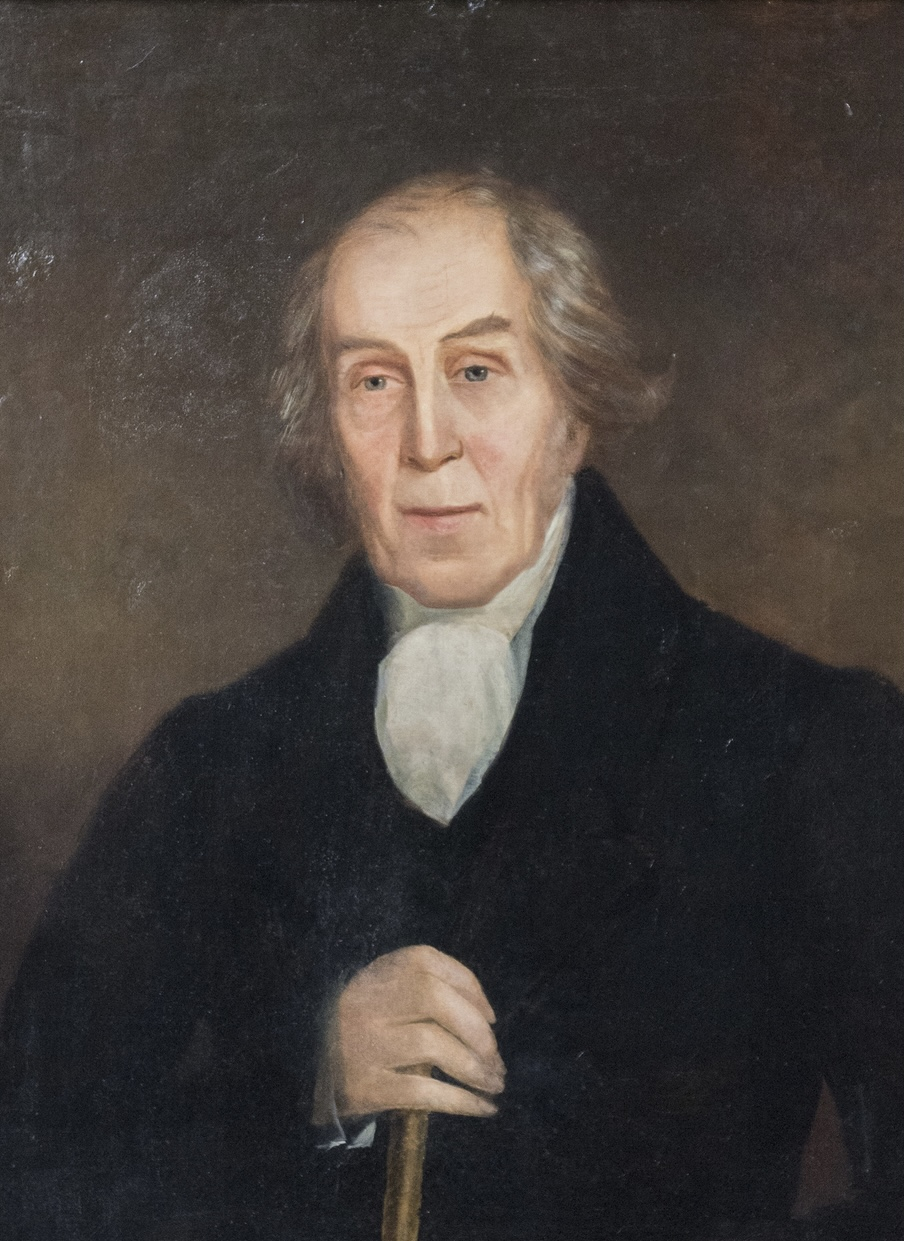

Resident of Dutch Bengal
- In office 15 September 1817 – 7 May 1825
- Monarch: William I
- Governor General: Godert van der Capellen
- Preceded by: British occupation
- Succeeded by: position abolished

Personal details
- Born: 6 February 1765 Netherlands
- Died: 25 September 1840 (aged 75) Chinsurah, India
- Spouse: Sarah Leonora Jacoba Eilbrecht

Daniel Anthony Overbeek (6 February 1765 – 25 September 1840) was the last resident of Dutch Bengal between 1817 and 1825.

== Biography ==
Daniel Anthony Overbeek was born to Daniel Overbeek (1727–1770) and Theodora Petronella Immens. Relatives on his father's side had long been employees of the Dutch East India Company, with the brother of his grandfather Nicolaas Overbeek, who was also called Daniel Overbeek, even serving as governor of Dutch Ceylon. Like his father, Daniel Anthony Overbeek made a career in Dutch Bengal, until in 1795 the Dutch possessions were ceded to the British by instruction of Dutch stadtholder William V, who wanted to prevent revolutionary France from taking possession of the Dutch holdings in Asia.

Under the terms of the Anglo-Dutch Treaty of 1814, Dutch Bengal was to be restored to Dutch rule, and a commission under the leadership of Jacob Andries van Braam was installed by the Dutch East Indies government on 28 June 1817 to effect the transfer of the Dutch possessions on the Indian subcontinent. Van Braam arrived in Chinsurah on 28 August 1817 and met with the British colonial administrator Gordon Forbes, who officially handed over the Dutch possessions on 15 September 1817. Van Braam installed Overbeek as resident of Dutch Bengal.

In 1822, Overbeek laid the foundation stone for the spire of the Armenian Church of St. John the Baptist in Chinsurah. In 1823, Overbeek became a corresponding member of the Royal Batavian Society of Arts and Sciences, to which he donated a silver Vishnu from Birma.

In 1824, the Dutch conceded to relinquishing all their possessions on the Indian subcontinent in return for control over Bencoolen. This meant that the Dutch possessions in Bengal were to become British again. Overbeek was in Batavia when the transfer was supposed to take place, leading acting resident B. C. D. Bouman to effect the transfer of sovereignty on 7 May 1825.

Daniel Anthony Overbeek returned to Chinsurah after the transfer of sovereignty and lived there until his death on 25 September 1840. He is buried in the Dutch cemetery of Chinsurah.

== Personal life ==
Daniel Anthony Overbeek married Sarah Leonora Jacoba Eilbrecht, with whom he had three daughters and one son. His daughter Johanna Leonora Christina Overbeek was the mother of orientalist William Wright.
