= Jacob Andries van Braam =

Dutch chief merchant (1771–1820)

President of the Council of the Indies
- In office 1808–1811
- Preceded by: Arnold Adriaan Buyskes
- Succeeded by: Abolished

Raad van Indië (Note: Member of the High Government of the Dutch East Indies)
- In office 16 January 1819 – 13 May 1820 Serving with Godert van der Capellen, Herman Warner Muntinghe, Petrus Theodorus Chassé, Reinier d'Ozy
- Preceded by: New creation
- Succeeded by: Hendrik Jan van de Graaff

Personal details
- Born: Jacob Andries van Braam; 26 January 1771 Chin-Surah, Houghly, Dutch Bengal
- Died: 12 May 1820 (aged 49) Batavia
- Spouse: Ambrosia Wilhelmina van Rijck (m. 1800)
- Parents: Jacob Pieter van Braam (father); Ursula Martha Fact (mother)
- Profession: VOC Chief merchant
- Awards: Knight Commander of the Order of the Union

Jacob Andries van Braam (Chin-Surah, Houghly, Dutch Bengal, 26 January 1771 – Batavia, 12 May 1820) was a Dutch opperkoopman (chief merchant) of the VOC and member of the High Government of the Dutch East Indies.

== Life ==
=== Personal life ===
Van Braam was the son of Jacob Pieter van Braam, and Ursula Martha Fact. He married Ambrosia Wilhelmina van Rijck in Batavia on 5 April 1800. She died in Batavia 2 October 1864.

=== Career ===
Van Braam went with the VOC embassy of his uncle Andreas Everardus van Braam Houckgeest, together with Isaac Titsingh, and Chrétien-Louis-Joseph de Guignes, to the court of the Qianlong Emperor in 1794–1795 to Peking to keep him company. (Note: There he must have met Reinier d'Ozy, his future colleague in the High Government of the Dutch East Indies, though the difference in social status may have prevented them from becoming friends.) In 1800 he was the external regent of the almshouses in Batavia and of the pennists' institution, (Note: Benevolent institution for retired clerical staff of the VOC.) and from 1803 to 1807 he was chief merchant and harbormaster in the city. In 1808 he became the first president of the high court of the Emperor of Solo, and president of the Council of the Indies (succeeding Arnold Adriaan Buyskes). In 1810, as president of that Council, he suppressed riots by acting on behalf of Governor-General Herman Daendels, who was in the vicinity with troops, to send an ultimatum to the Sultan of Djokja, who on 31 December 1810 was deposed. In 1809 also, he was awarded the commandership in the Order of the Union. In 1811, in his house in Batavia, Daendels took his leave from the (French) government, and the new Governor General Janssens. Van Braam himself resigned on 18 September 1811, after the French capitulation to the British. He left Batavia on 18 February 1812 and was in November of that year in London.

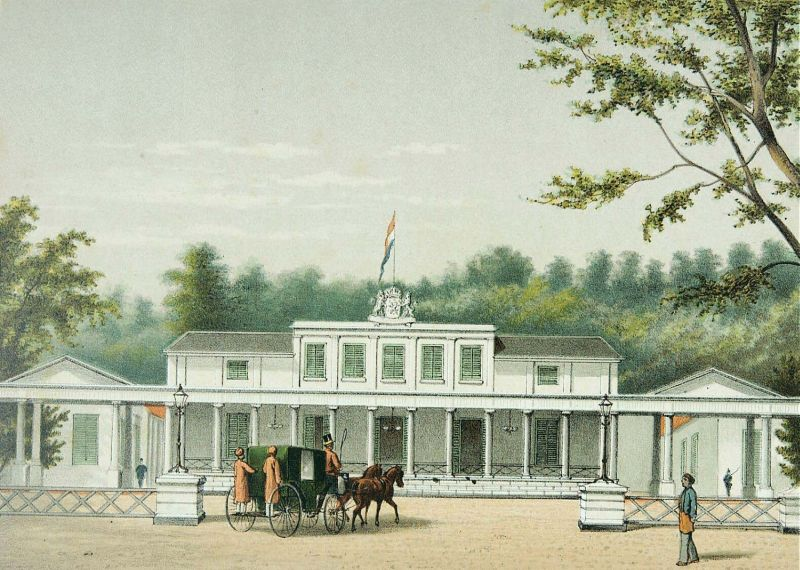
House that Jacob Andries van Braam had built in Rijswijk, Batavia. (Note: Currently Istana Negara (Jakarta))

After the restoration of Dutch authority in August 1816 he was charged by the Commissioners-General of the Dutch East Indies in 1817 and 1818 with the re-takeover of the Dutch colonial possessions in Dutch Bengal and Dutch Coromandel. For that journey he bought a ship for his own account at a cost of 70,000 rijksdaalders, which shows that he was not lacking for money. He placed the authority in these Indian possessions in the hands of the Resident, at Chin-Surah, Van Overbeek (Note: Van der Aa remarks that Van Braam was opposed to handing those possessions to the British, but was overruled at the conclusion of the Anglo-Dutch Treaty of 1824.) At the forming of the new High Government of the Dutch East Indies in 1819 he was appointed a member of it; however, he died soon after.

== Sources ==
- Aa, A. J. van der, ed. (1878). "Braam, Jacob Andries van". Biografisch Woordenboek der Nederlanden. Bijvoegsel (DBNL) (in Dutch). p. 154.
- Blok, P.J.; Molhuysen, P.C., eds. (1918). "Braam, Jacob Andries van". Nieuw Nederlandsch biografisch woordenboek (DBNL) (in Dutch). Sijthoff. pp. 274–275.
