= Overbeek =

Overbeek may refer to:

- Daniel Overbeek (1695–1751), Dutch colonial ruler of Ceylon
- Daniel Anthony Overbeek (1765–1840), Dutch resident of Bengal
- Theodoor Overbeek (1911-2007), Dutch chemist
- Michiel Daniel Overbeek (1920–2001), South African amateur astronomer
- Henk Overbeek (born 1949), Dutch international relations scholar and politician
- 5038 Overbeek, an asteroid
