= Hooghly Jail =

Jail in West Bengal

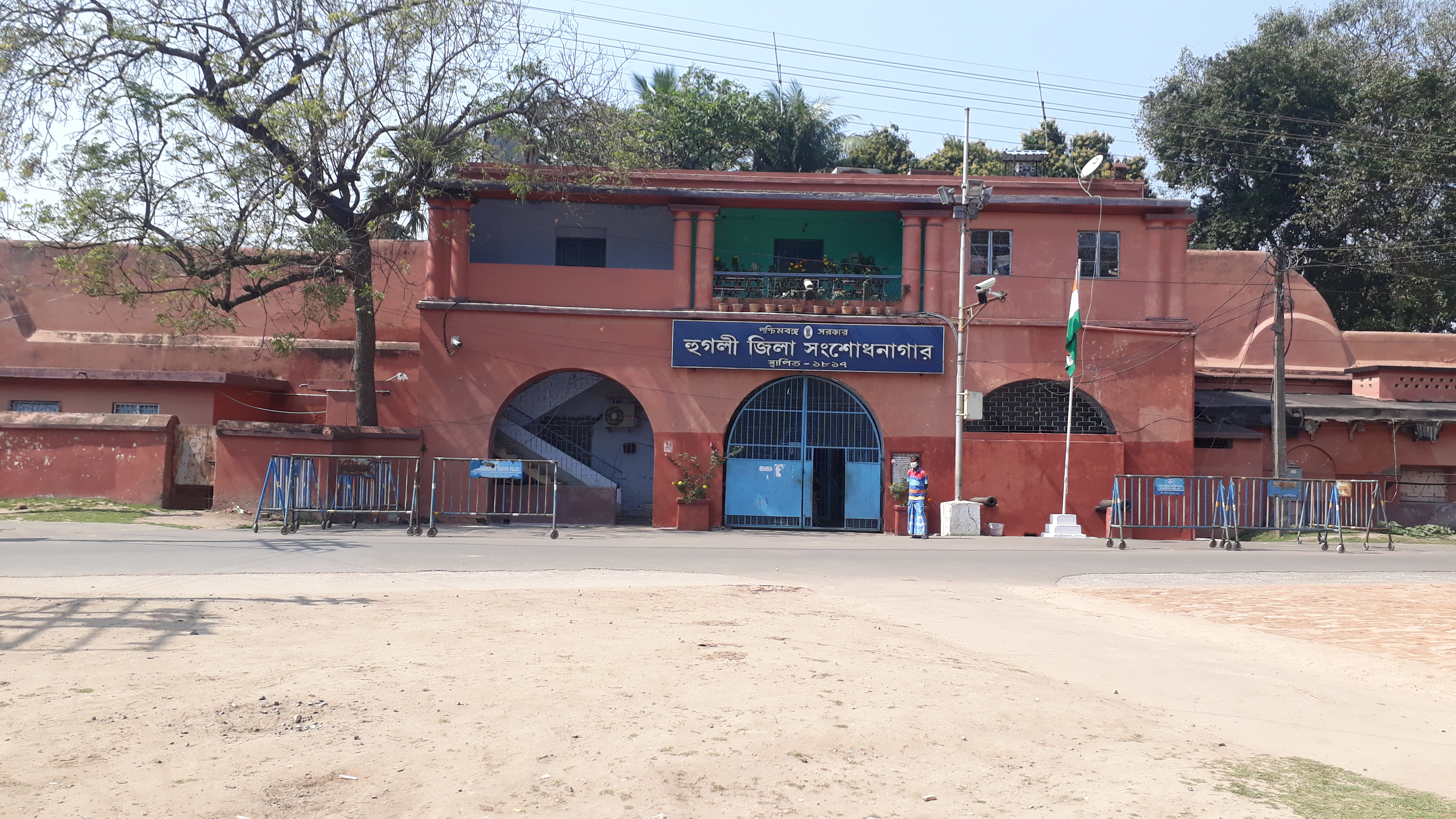
- Location: Hugli-Chuchura
- Status: Operational
- Security class: District Correctional Home
- Opened: 1817
- Managed by: Government of West Bengal

Notable prisoners
- Kazi Nazrul Islam (briefly)

Hooghly Jail or the Hooghly District Correctional Home, is a prison and itself a heritage building situated at Hugli-Chuchura in the Indian state of West Bengal.

== History ==
This is one of the oldest prison center of West Bengal since East India Company rule. The jail was founded in 1817 beside the Hooghly River. Primarily the jail building was a private doweling house of a native Indian and the ration system of the jail was introduced in 1836. During the British rule, political prisoners were kept here in solitary confinement. Kazi Nazrul Islam, the Bengali revolutionary poet was incarcerated in a solitary cell of this jail 14 April 1923 to 17 June 1923. He wrote a few patriotic poems while he was imprisoned at Hooghly Jail.
