= Motihar Kuthi =

Coordinates: 24.3666°N 88.6385°E

Motihar Kuthi (Bengali: মোতিয়ার কুঠি) is a colonial building situated at Rajshahi, within the Rajshahi University campus and close to its main gate. It is now used as the office BNCC of the university. In general appearance it is similar to the kuthis of Sardah so it was built in 1781 by Dutch East India Company.

== History ==
from 17th to 18th century kuthis were built as a residence or factory engaged in silk and indigo trade. In Rajshahi region alone more than 152 indigo kuthis were in operation with their headquarters at Sardah. Motihar kuthi is one of them. At a short distance there is another kuthi named kaajla. These two kuthis were at one time connected by the tributary river connecting with the Ganges.

== Exterior and interior ==
Motihar Kuthi is single storied. It is rectangular, 70 feet (21 m) east–west by 50 feet (15 m) north–south, and faces south. The south and east sides have a veranda 10 feet (3.0 m) wide, supported by round simple pillars with a set of three pillars at the corner. The building has supporting on its north and west which appear to have been kitchen, warehouse which is now used as godowns of university.

== See also ==
- Motihar Thana
- Boro Kuthi
