= Dutch Cemetery, Chinsurah =

Historic cemetery in West Bengal

Dutch Cemetery
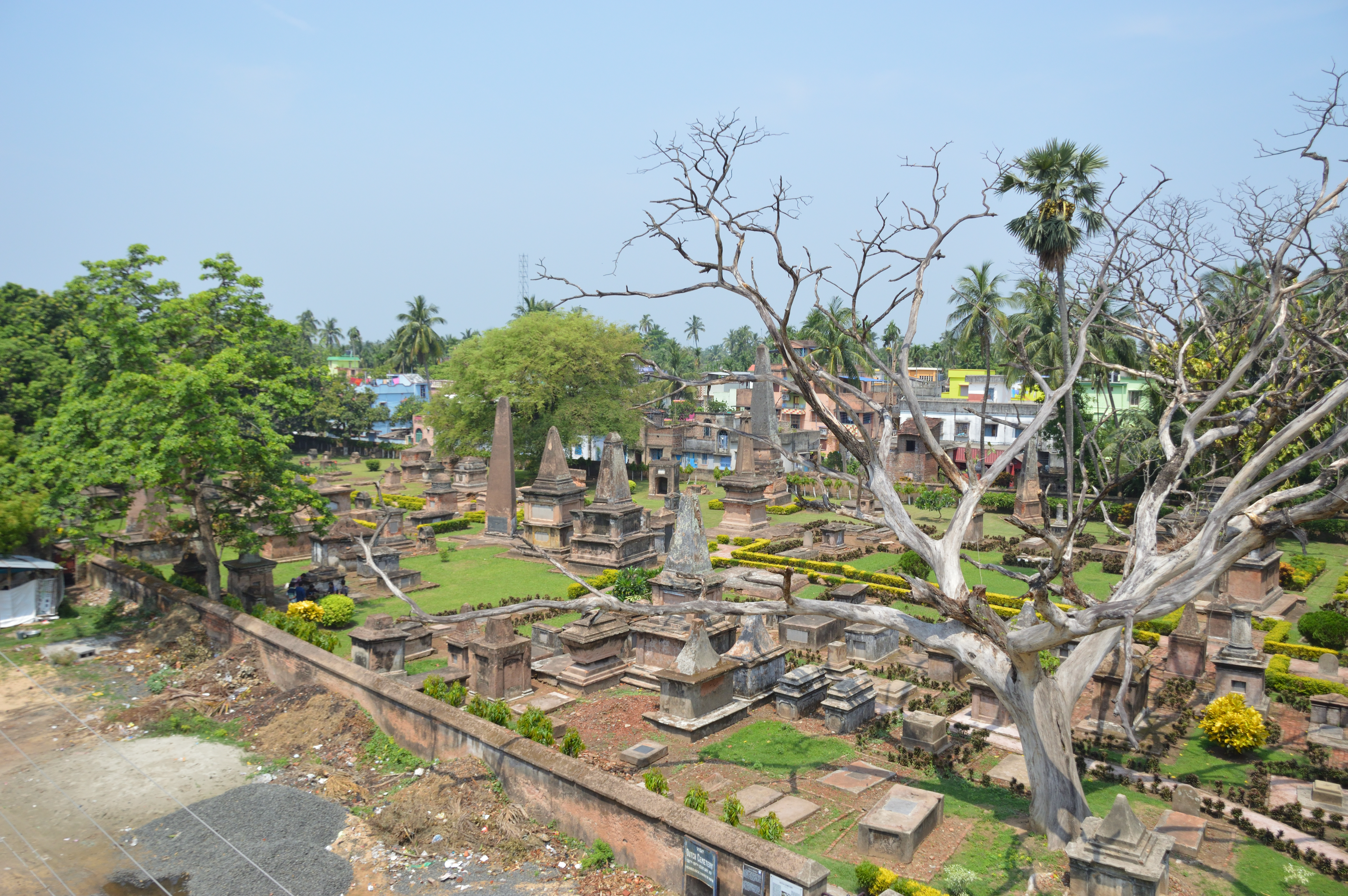
- Skyline of Dutch Cemetery
- Interactive map of Dutch Cemetery

Details
- Location: Chinsurah
- Country: India
- Coordinates: 22°53′27″N 88°23′32″E
- Type: Public

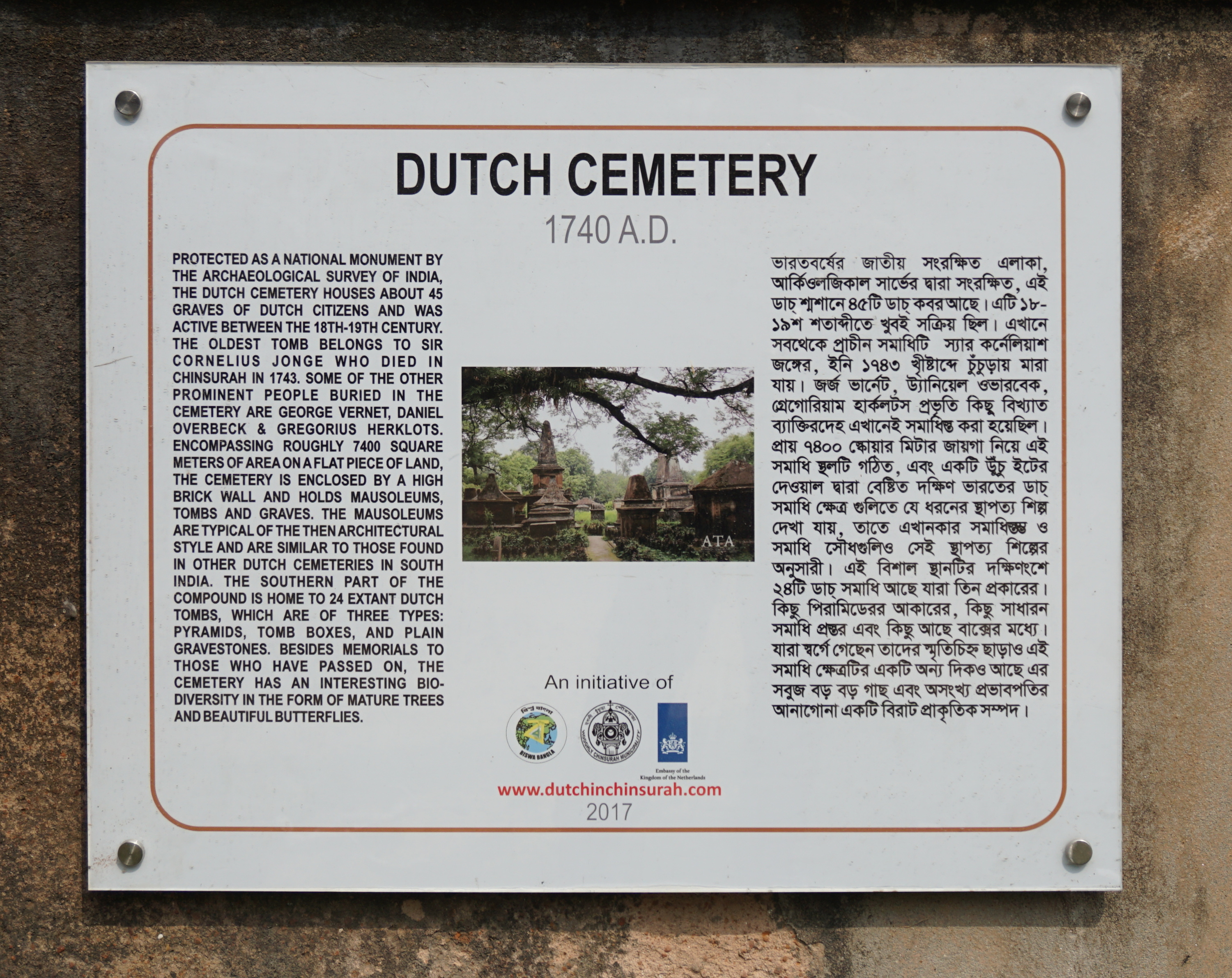
Plaque with history of the cemetery

The Dutch Cemetery (Dutch: Nederlandse begraafplaats) of Chinsurah was constructed on the order of the director of the Dutch East India Company in Bengal. The cemetery and all its graves are now maintained and Archaeological Survey of India under the protection of ancient monuments and archaeological sites and remains of national importance.

== Notable people buried ==
- Charles Cameron, Scottish army officer
- Daniel Anthony Overbeek, the last resident of Dutch Bengal
