= Boro Kuthi =

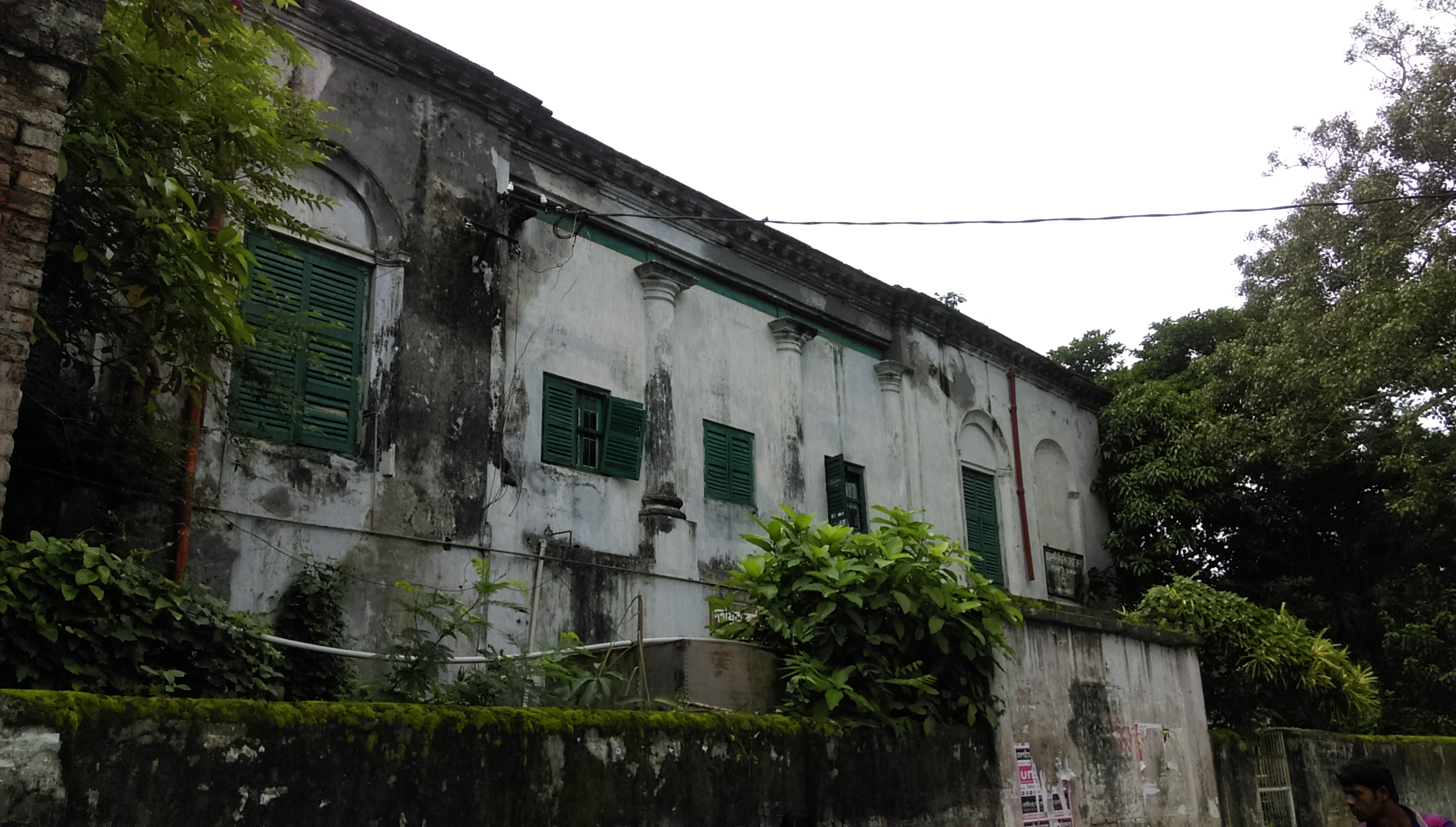
- Location: Rajshahi

History
- Built: 18th century

Site notes
- Architectural style: Indo-Saracenic Revival architecture

Boro Kuthi (Bengali: বড়কুঠি) is a historic building in Rajshahi, Bangladesh built by Dutch traders in the eighteenth century. The building was also used as the first administrative center for Rajshahi University. The building is now under the Ministry of Cultural Affairs to preserve as a cultural heritage, and planned to be turned into a museum.

== History ==
Located on the bank of Padma river, it is believed to be built by Dutch traders during first of eighteen century. During that period several other building such at Motihar kuthi were constructed in the area for silk and indigo trading. When Dutch traders left India after the fall of Nawab Siraj ud-Daulah in 1757, they handed over the building to British East India Company. The company later sold the building to Robert Watson and Company in 1833. After the British left in 1947, the building was used as government's supply center. In 1953, the building was handed over to newly started Rajshahi University to be used as its administrative building. The building was handed over again to the Ministry of Cultural Affairs to preserve as a heritage site of the city.

== Building description ==
Boro Kuthi is located on the bank of the river Padma, south of Rajshahi College. It is a two-storey, 24 meters length, 17.4 meters wide building with twelve rooms of different size. There is a hall room which is 9.6 meters in length and 6.3 meters wide at the center first floor, with two balcony on north and south side. Though the building was used for silk and indigo trading, it is believed the Portuguese used the building as a fort during emergency time. Three canons which were recovered from the site are now be Rajshahi Police line.
