= Hugli-Chuchura =

City in West Bengal, India

Hugli-Chuchura Hooghly-Chinsurah
- City
- Chinsurah
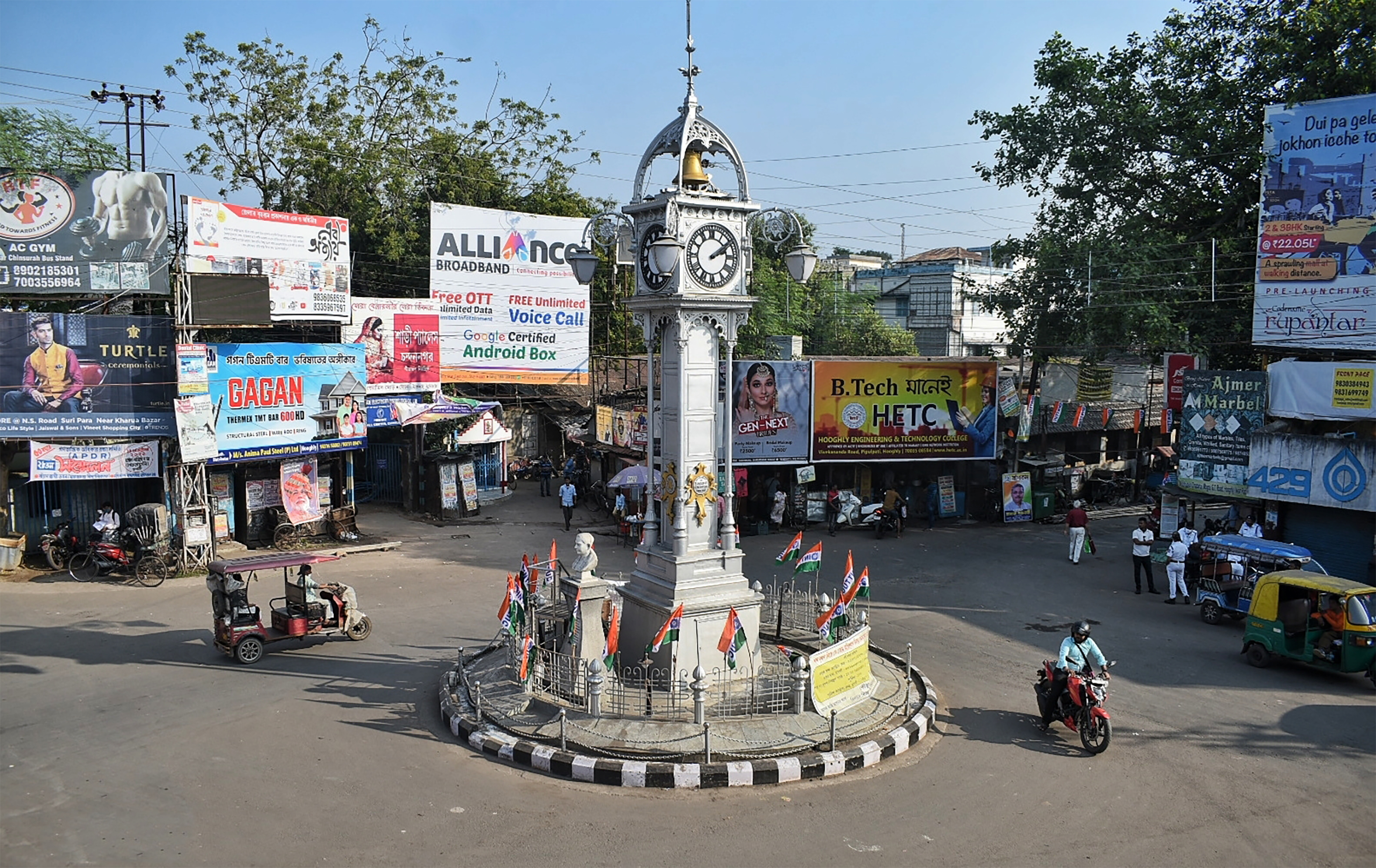
- Edwardian Clock Tower (Ghorir More)
- Nickname(s): Chunchura, Olondajnagari
- Location within West Bengal Location within India
- Coordinates: 22.90°N 88.39°E
- Country: India
- State: West Bengal
- Division: Burdwan
- District: Hooghly
- Subdivision: Chinsurah
- Establishment of Hooghly by Portuguese (Luís de Ataíde, 1st Marquis of Santarém, Viceroy of Portuguese India): 1537
- Establishment of Chinsurah by Dutch: 1635
- Annexation by British East India Company: 1825
- Establishment of Hooghly-Chinsurah Municipality: 1865
- Founder: Luís de Ataíde, 1st Marquis of Santarém, Viceroy of Portuguese India
- Named for: Special cane or spire

Government
  - Type: Municipality
  - Body: Hooghly Chinsurah Municipality
  - Chairman: Vacant
  - Vice-Chairman: Vacant

Area
  - Total: 18 km^{2} (6.9 sq mi)
  - Rank: 2nd in Hooghly District
- Elevation: 9 m (30 ft)

Population (2015)
  - Total: 288,090
  - Rank: 2nd in Hooghly District after Serampore
  - Density: 6,641/km^{2} (17,200/sq mi)

Languages
  - Official: Bengali, English
- Time zone: UTC+5:30 (IST)
- PIN: 712101, 712102, 712103, 712104, 712105, 712106
- Telephone code: +91 33
- Vehicle registration: WB 15
- Sex ratio: 995 ♀/♂
- Lok Sabha constituency: Hooghly
- Member of Parliament: Rachana Banerjee (NDA)
- Vidhan Sabha constituency: Chunchura
- Member of Legislative Assembly: Subir Nag (Pokan) (BJP)
- Website: hooghly.nic.in hcm.net.in

Hugli-Chuchura (pronounced [huɡli tʃũtʃuɽa]), also known by its former names Chinsurah or Hooghly-Chinsurah, is a city of Hooghly district and the district headquarters of Hooghly division in the Indian state of West Bengal. It is one of the densely populated cities of West Bengal. It lies on the bank of Hooghly River, 35 km north of Kolkata, the state capital. It is located in the district of Hooghly and is home to the district headquarters. Chuchura houses the Commissioner of the Burdwan Range. The District Court building of Chinsurah is the longest building in West Bengal. It is a part of the area covered by Kolkata Metropolitan Development Authority (KMDA).

Chinsurah is the home to the 1000 KW DRM transmitter of Prasar Bharti which enables 'Akashvani Maitree' to be broadcast across Bangladesh. This special Bangla service of All India Radio was launched in the wake of the Bangladesh Liberation Movement and played a key role during the war, broadcasting Indian news bulletins in Bangladesh. It continued till April 2010 but was discontinued thereafter due to decommissioning of the Super Power Transmitter at Chinsurah. The headquarters of the Hooghly District Sports Association (HDSA) and the Imambara Sadar District Hospital is situated here. Chinsurah is also the home of the oldest Armenian church in India and old Hindu Temples. It is one of the Literate cities in West Bengal. The literacy per cent of this city is 91%. It is one of the rapidly growing urban areas of West Bengal.

== Demographics ==
Historical population
Year	Pop.	±%
1901	29,383	—
1911	28,916	−1.6%
1921	29,938	+3.5%
1931	32,634	+9.0%
1941	49,081	+50.4%
1951	56,805	+15.7%
1961	83,104	+46.3%
1971	105,241	+26.6%
1981	138,915	+32.0%
1991	173,496	+24.9%
2001	184,173	+6.2%
2011	177,259	−3.8%
Source: Government of India

Hinduism	92.15%
Islam	5.95%
Christianity	1.06%
Buddhism	0.14%
Sikhism	0.13%
Jainism	0.03%
Others	0.54%
Religions in Burari (2011)

In 2011, Hooghly-Chinsurah had a population of 177,259, with 88,844 males and 88,415 females. Its population declined by 3.8% from 2001, when it had a population of 184,173. The average literacy rate is 91.1%, with 93.81% for males and 88.39% for females. The sex ratio is 995 females per 1000 males. A vast majority of people in Hooghly-Chinsurah practice Hinduism, with about 92%. The second most practised religion is Islam, with about 6% of people being Muslim.

As per 2011 Census of India Hugli-Chinsurah had a total population of 2,88,506 of which 1,44,267 (50%) were males and 1,44,239 (50%) were females. Population below 6 years was 22,604. The total number of literates in Hugli-Chinsurah was 2,42,055 (91.04% of the population over 6 years).

The following Municipalities and Census Towns in Hooghly district were part of Kolkata Urban Agglomeration in 2011 census: Bansberia (M), Hugli-Chinsurah (M), Bara Khejuria (Out Growth), Shankhanagar (CT), Amodghata (CT), Chak Bansberia (CT), Naldanga (CT), Kodalia (CT), Kulihanda (CT), Simla (CT), Dharmapur (CT), Bhadreswar (M), Champdani (M), Chandannagar (M Corp.), Baidyabati (M), Serampore (M), Rishra (M), Rishra (CT), Bamunari (CT), Dakshin Rajyadharpur (CT), Nabagram Colony (CT), Konnagar (M), Uttarpara Kotrung (M), Raghunathpur (PS-Dankuni) (CT), Kanaipur (CT) and Keota (CT).

As of 2001 India census, Hugli-Chinsurah had a population of 170,201. Males constitute 51.06% of the population and females 48.94%. Hugli-Chinsurah has an average literacy rate of 82.55%, higher than the national average of 74.04%: male literacy is 87.93% and female literacy is 76.95%.

=== Languages ===
Languages spoken in Hooghly-Chinsurah city (2011)
1. Bengali (92.9%)
2. Hindi (5.97%)
3. Santali (0.23%)
4. 0.00%
5. Urdu (0.11%)
6. Others (0.63%)

== Etymology ==
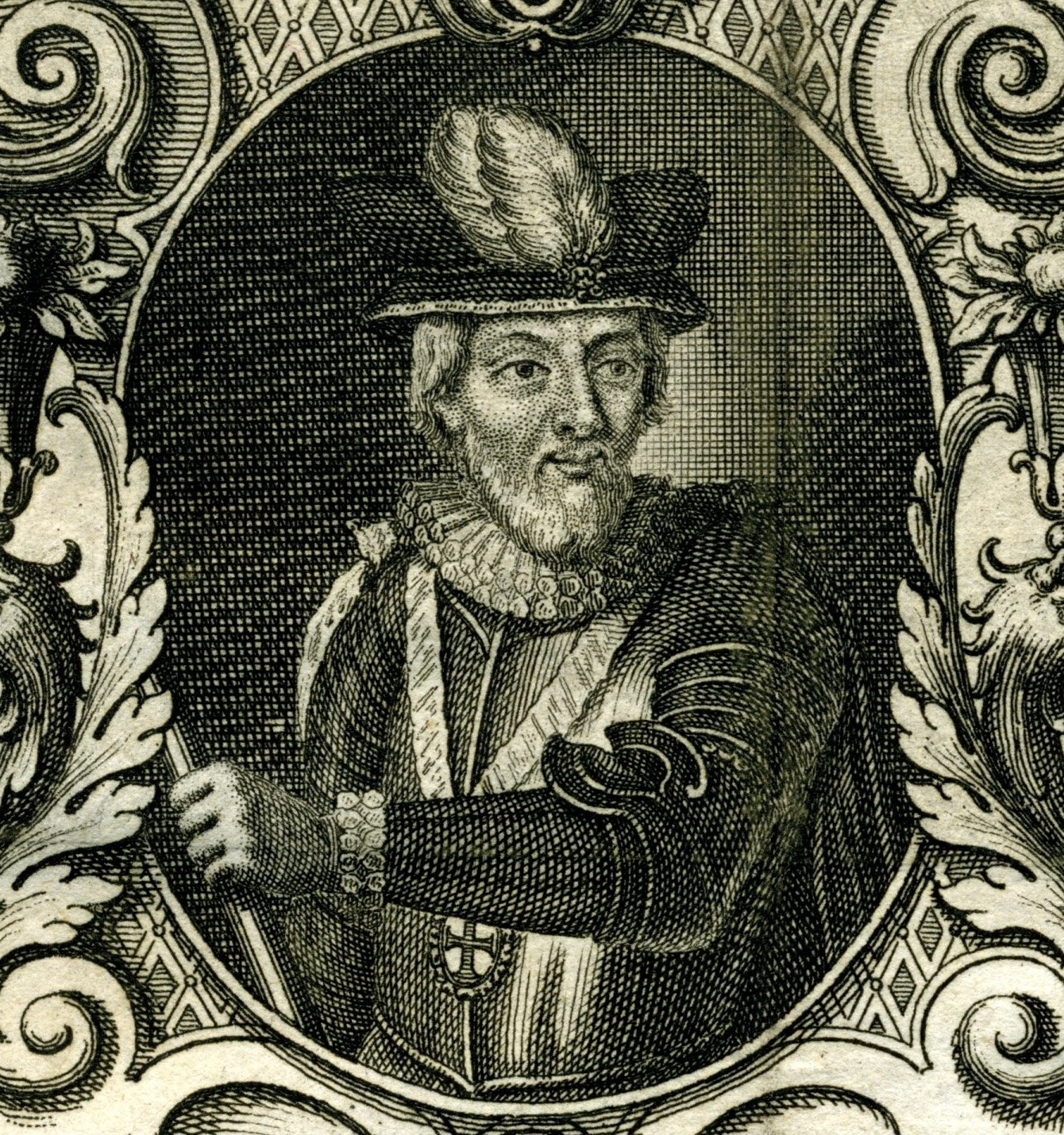
Hugli-Chuchura was founded as Ugulim in 1579 by order of Luís de Ataíde, 1st Marquis of Santarém, Viceroy of Portuguese India.

Hooghly-Chuchura was a municipality formed by the merging of two towns, Hugli and Chinsura, in 1865. The names are spelled in other ways including Hooghly, Hugli, Hughli, Ugulim (in Portuguese), Chinsura, Chunchura, Chuchro and Chinsurah.

State Highway 6/ Grand Trunk Road (G.T. Road) passes through the town. Chuchura and Hooghly are historic stations on the Howrah-Bardhaman main line of the Eastern Railway. Ferry services across the Hooghly River serves as a link with the district of North 24 Parganas.

== Geography ==
Cities and towns in the Chinsurah subdivision (except Polba Dadpur and Dhaniakhali CD Blocks) in Hooghly district
M: municipal city/ town, CT: census town, R: rural/ urban centre,
Owing to space constraints in the small map, the actual locations in a larger map may vary slightly

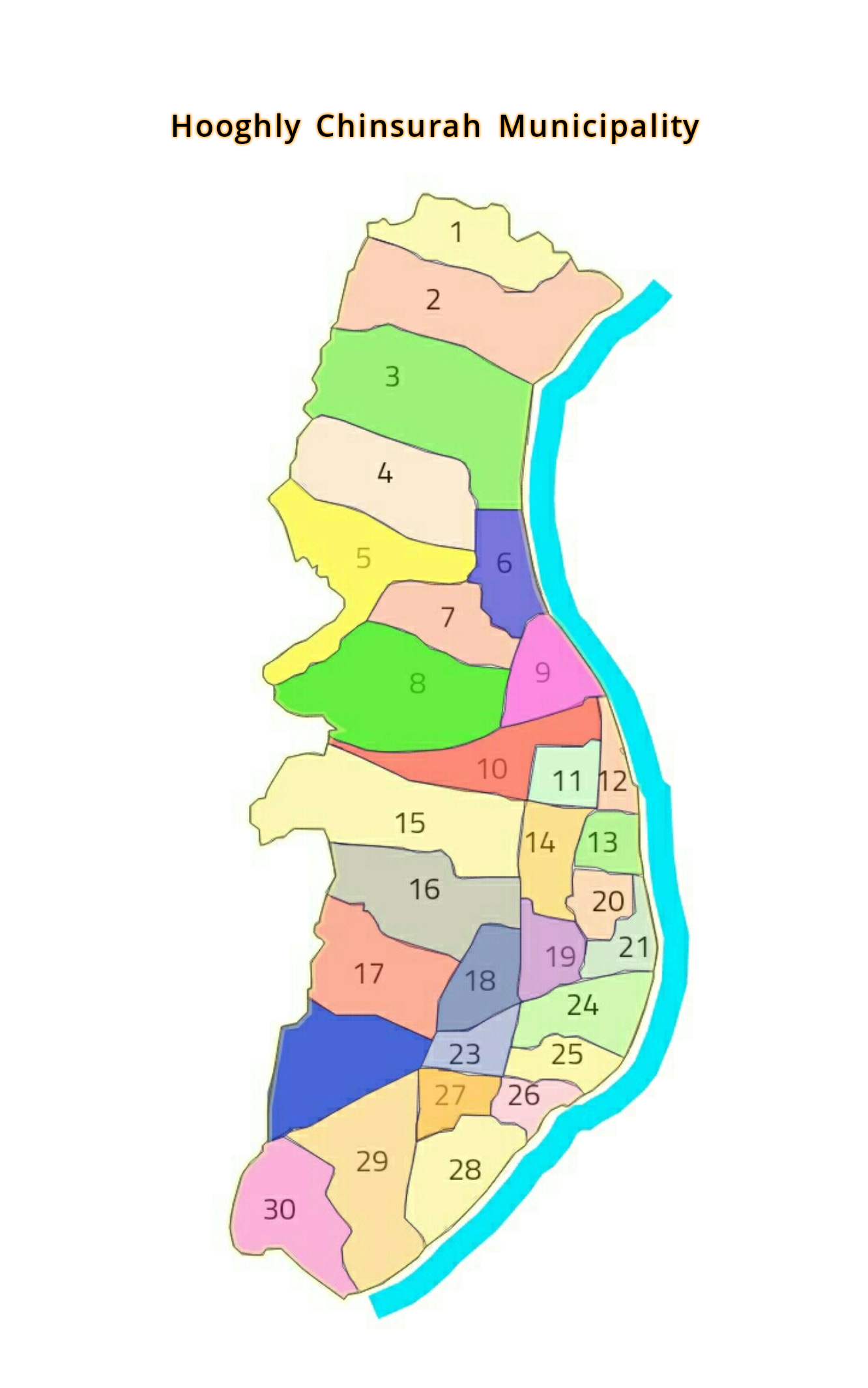
Map of Hooghly Chinsurah municipality

=== Location ===
Hugli-Chuchura is located at 22.90°N 88.39°E.

This city is on the flood plain on the right bank of river Bhagirathi-Hooghly. The area is composed of flat alluvial plains that forms part of the Gangetic Delta. The high west bank of the tidal Hooghly River is highly industrialised.

Keota, Manushpur, Naldanga, Kodalia, Kulihanda, Dharampur and Simla form a cluster of census towns on the eastern side of Hugli-Chuchura.

=== Urbanisation ===
There are 13 statutory towns and 64 census towns in Hooghly district. The right bank of the Hooghly River has been industrialised over a long period. With foreigners dominating the area's industry, trade and commerce for over two centuries, it is amongst the leading industrialised districts in the state. At the same time the land is fertile and agricultural production is significant.

In Chinsurah subdivision 68.63% of the population is rural and the urban population is 31.37%. It has two statutory and 23 census towns. In Chinsurah Mogra CD Block 64.87% of the population is urban and 35.13% is rural. Amongst the four remaining CD Blocks in the subdivision two were overwhelmingly rural and two were wholly rural.

The map alongside shows a portion of Chinsurah subdivision. All places marked in the map are linked in the larger full screen map.

== History ==
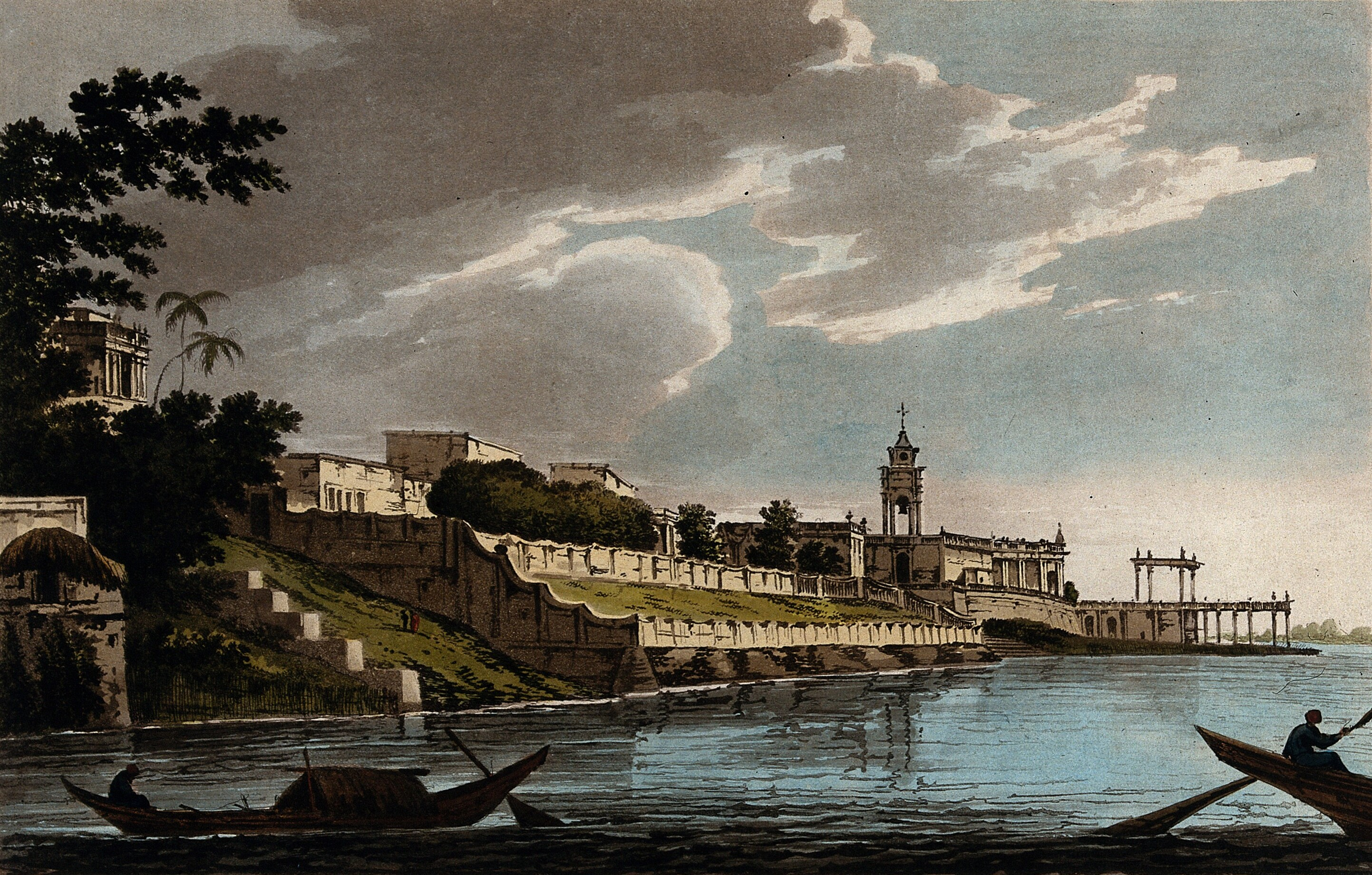
A View of Chinsura the Dutch settlement in Bengal

The Portuguese founded the town of Ugulim in 1579, but the district has thousands of years of heritage in the form of the great kingdom of Bhurshut. The city flourished as a trading port and some religious structures were built. One such structure is a Christian church dedicated to a statue of Mary, brought by the Portuguese.

In 1629, political disorder struck the city and the Mughal governor of Bengal expelled the Portuguese. The fleeing Portuguese lost the statue in the river, but local people later found it on the river bank. The arrested Portuguese were taken to Delhi, where a death sentence of trampling by elephants was decreed. When the emperor Shah Jahan heard this he ordered the priests released and granted a piece of land on the bank of the river Hooghly, where the statue of Mary was reestablished. There the Portuguese constructed a church to house the statue, which still receives pilgrims today. The church was renovated in the 1980s and has been declared as a basilica by the authority of Rome.

After the Portuguese expulsion, the town was made the royal port of Bengal, and all the public offices and records were established there. In 1640 the East India Company established a factory at Hugli, their first settlement in Lower Bengal.

In 1656 the Dutch also erected a factory on the site of the town. At that time Calcutta was the principal settlement in Dutch Bengal, who used it as a base for Dutch intra-Asian trade in opium, saltpetre, spices, cotton and indigo. However, in 1685, a dispute having taken place between the English factors and the nawab, the town was bombarded and burned to the ground.

In 1759 the Dutch garrison of Chinsurah, on its march to Chandernagore, attacked a British force under Colonel Forde. The Battle of Chinsurah lasted less than half an hour and ended with the rout of the Dutch attackers. In 1795, during the Napoleonic Wars, a British garrison occupied the settlement. The peace of 1814 restored Hughli to the Dutch. However, in 1825, the Dutch ceded many of their possessions in India to the British, in exchange for the British-occupied possessions in Sumatra.

Both Chinsurah and Hooghly played a role in the Bengal Renaissance and the Indian independence movement. "Vande Mataram", India's national song, was composed by Bankim Chandra Chattopadhyay at Joraghat in Chinsurah, who had been an alumnus of the Hooghly Collegiate School. Nazrul Islam's revolutionary songs were penned while he was imprisoned by the colonial government in Hooghly Jail (Hooghly District Correctional Home).

== Police stations ==
Chinsurah police station has jurisdiction over Hugli-Chuchura and Bansberia Municipal areas and a part of Chinsurah Mogra CD Block. Chinsurah police station has jurisdiction by Chandannagar Police Commissionerate. Chinsurah has a woman police station.

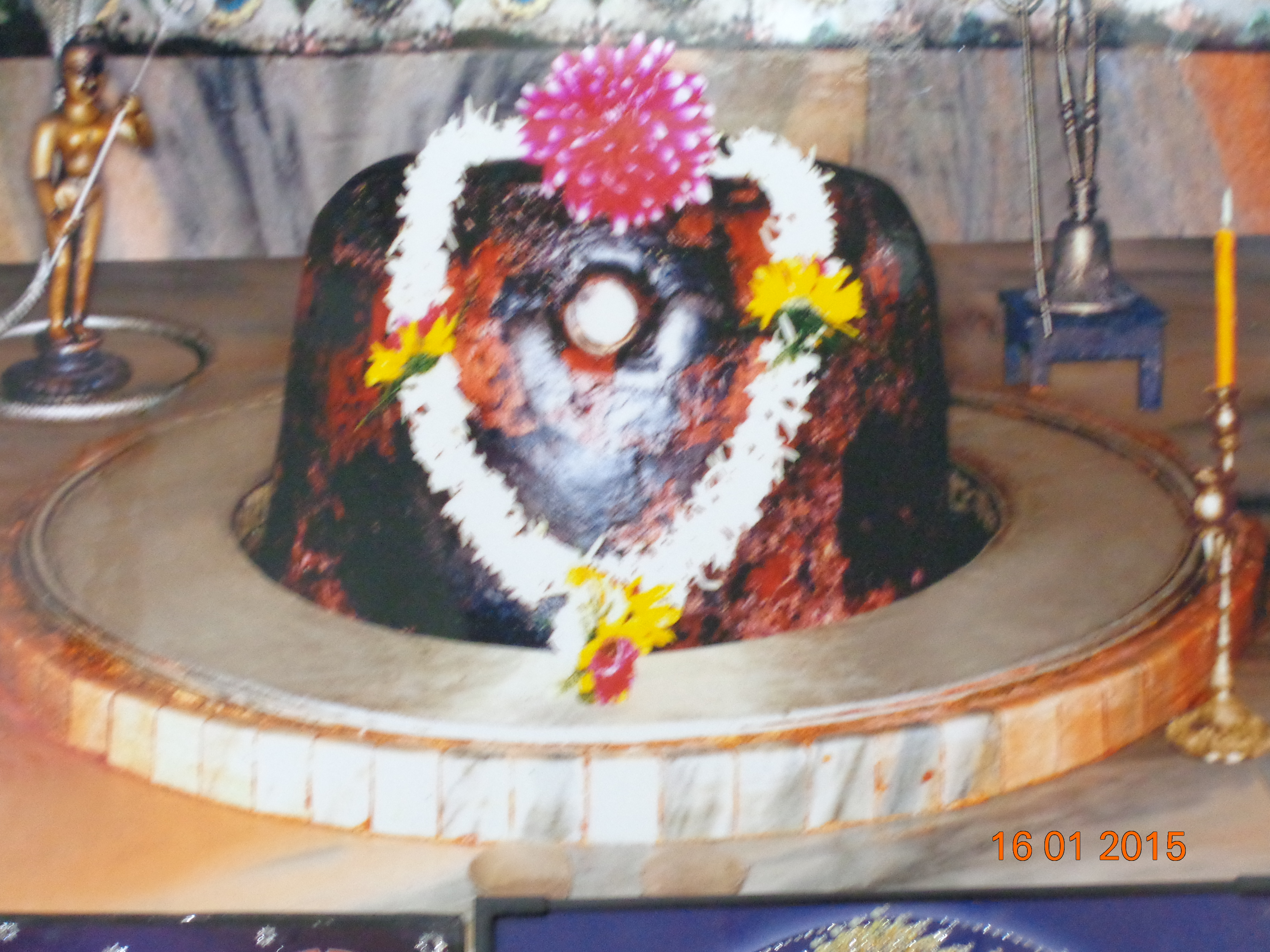
Lord Taraknath, Tarakeswar

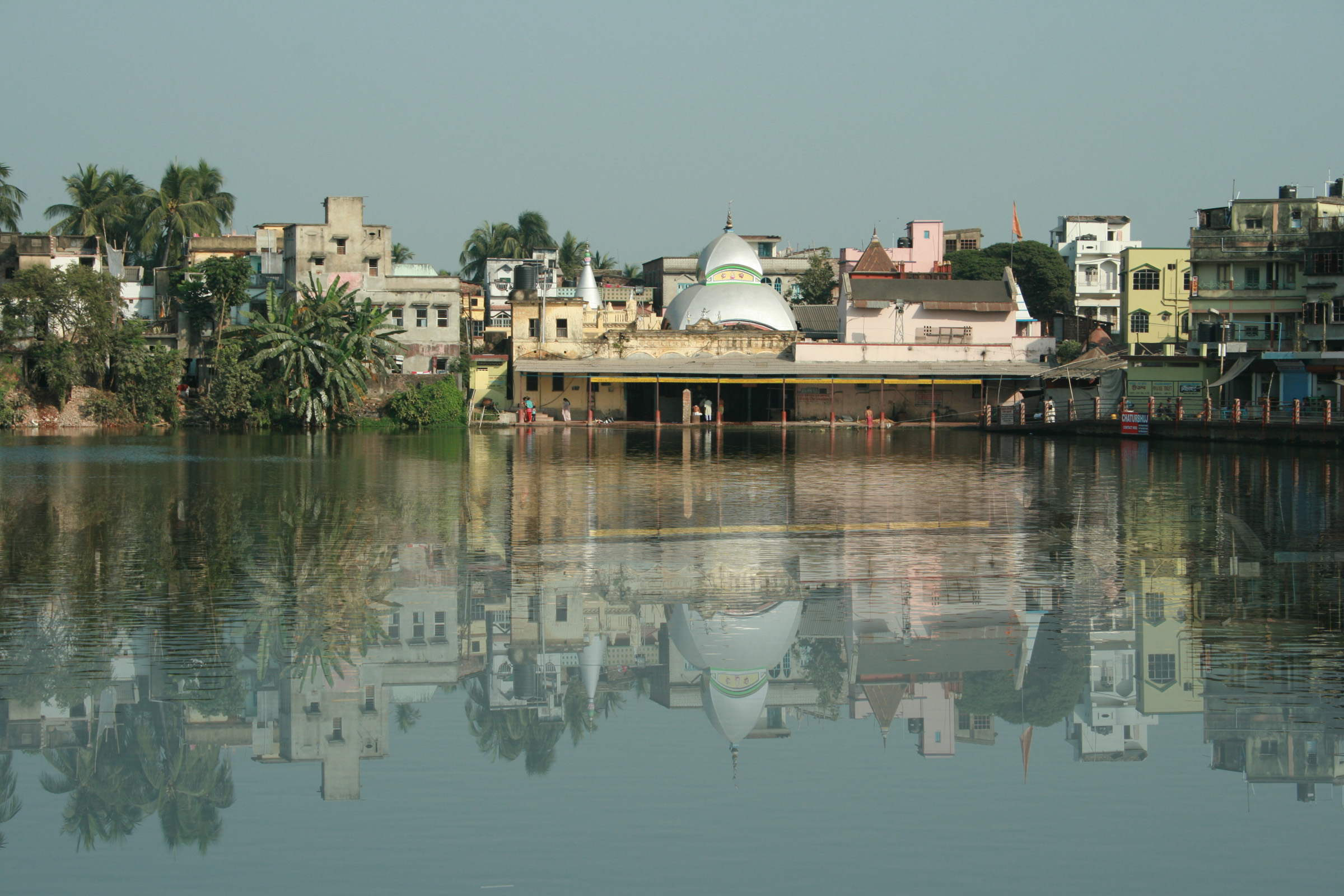
Taraknath Temple, Tarakeswar

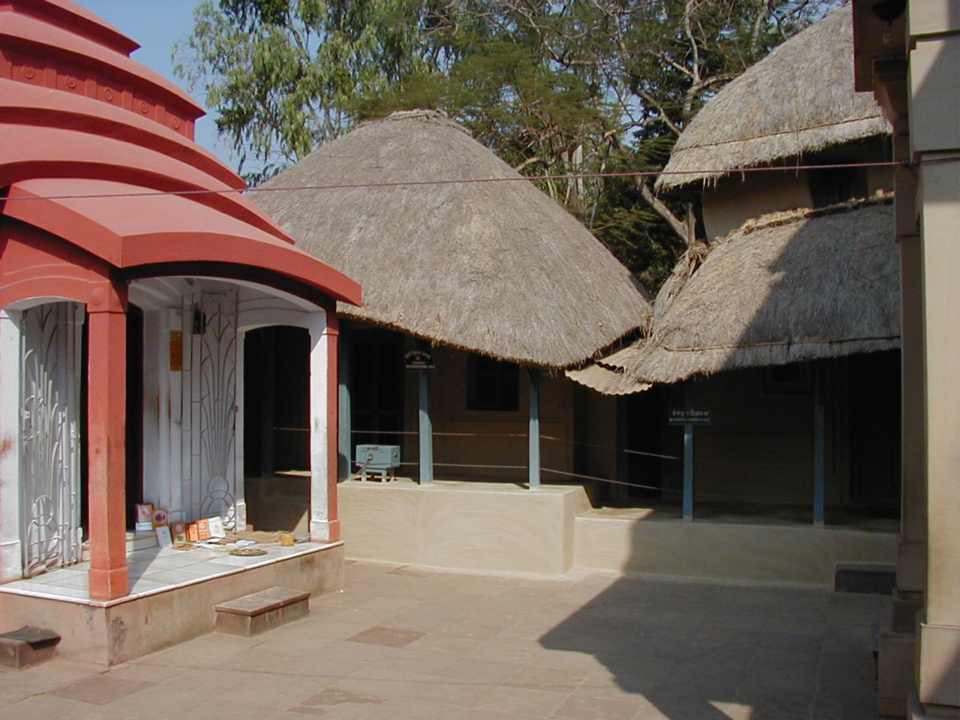
Kamarpukur Ramakrishna Hut, Kamarpukur

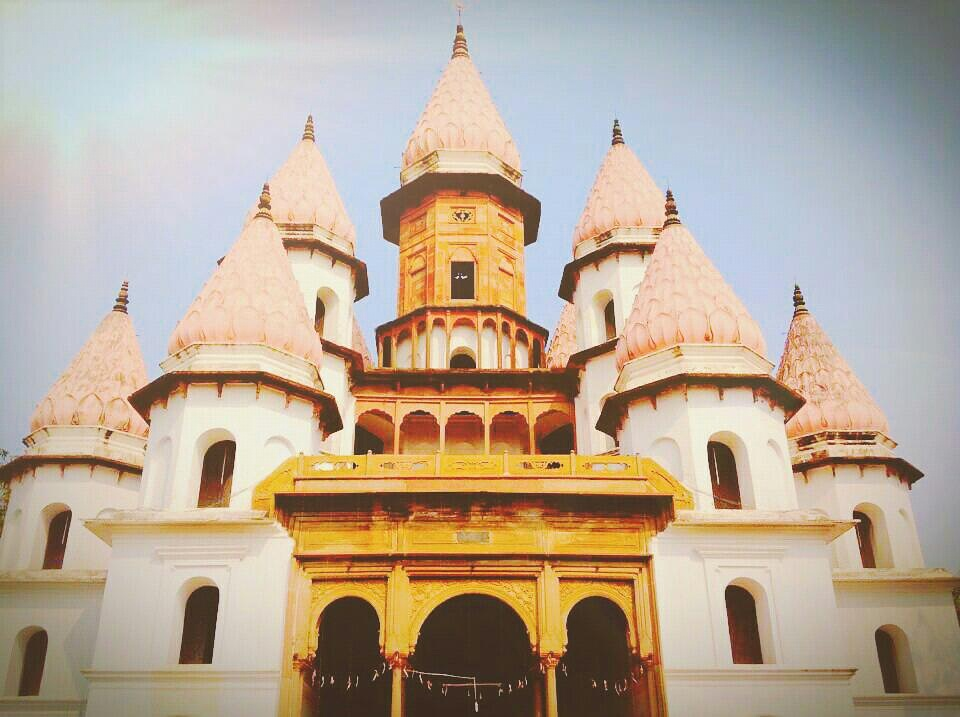
Hangseswari Temple, Bansberia, Hooghly

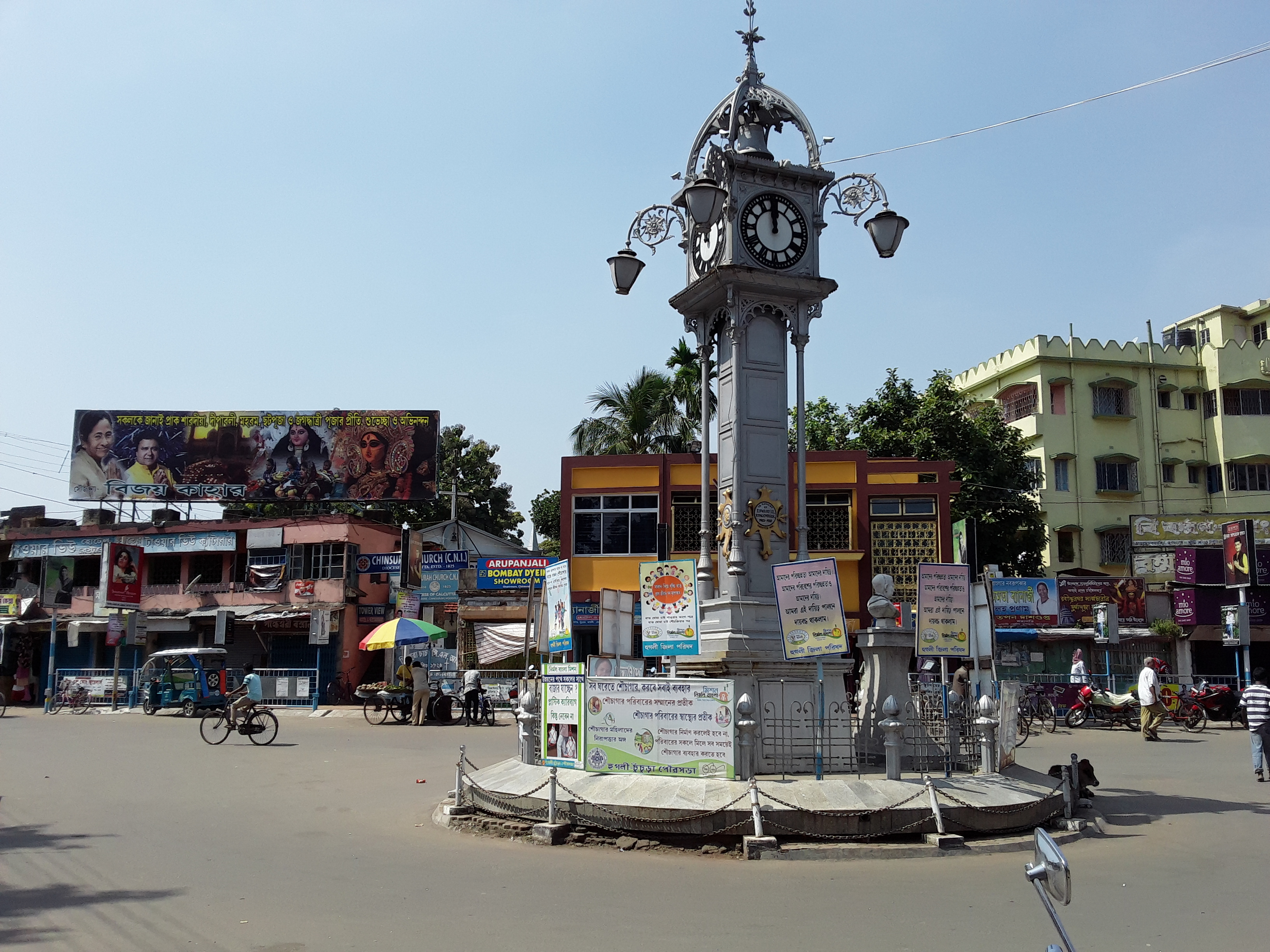
Ghorir More, Chinsurah

== Transportation ==
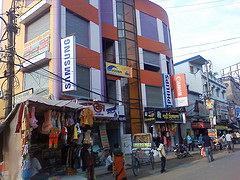
Chinsurah N.S. Road

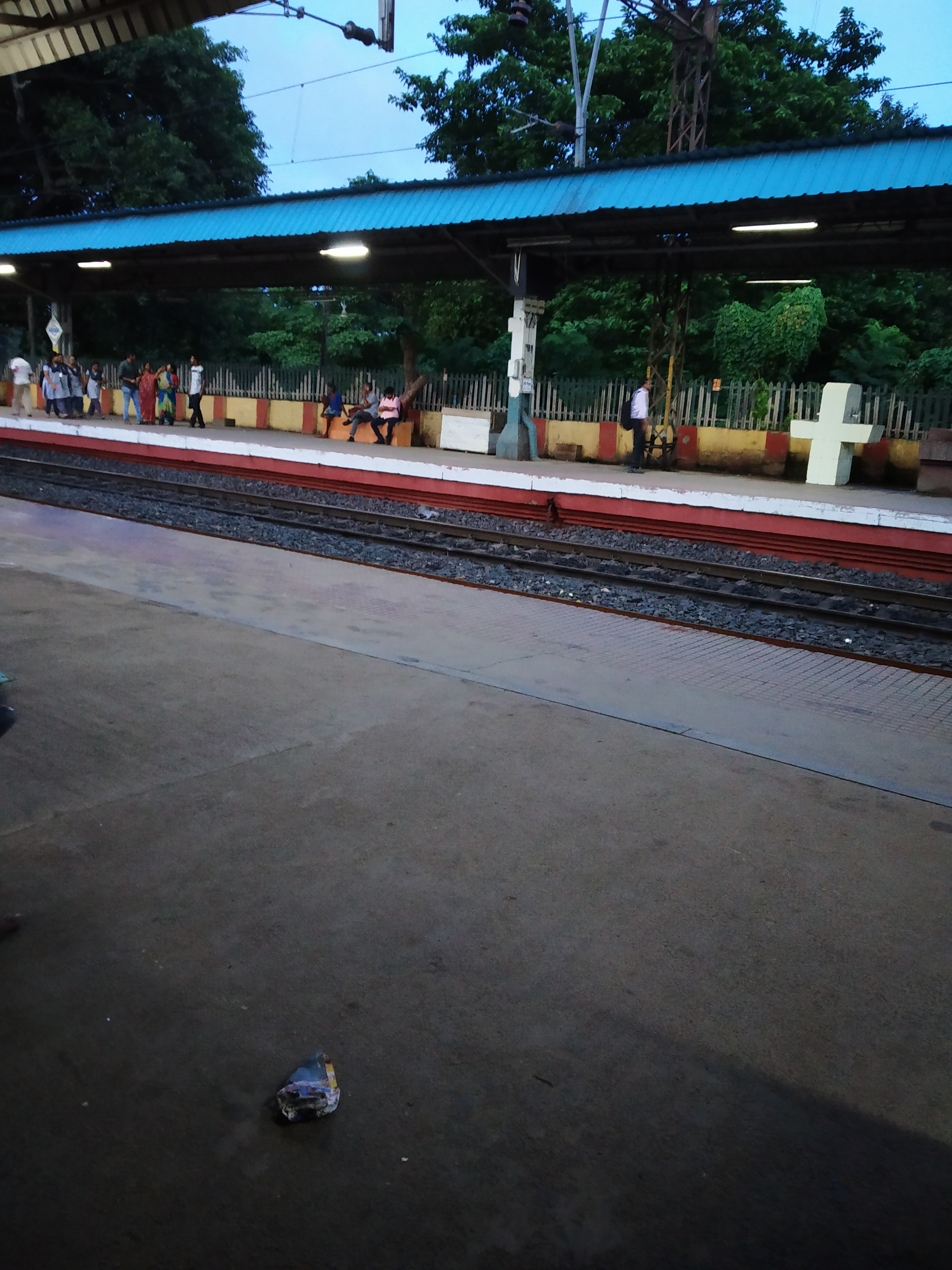
Chinsurah Railway Station

Hooghly-Chinsurah has four railway stations: Chuchura railway station (CNS), Hooghly railway station (HGY) and Bandel Junction railway station (BDC) on the Howrah line and Hooghly Ghat railway station (HYG) on the Sealdah line. Thus Chinsurah is well connected to Howrah, Burdwan, Katwa, Naihati and other cities. A few passenger and express trains stop at the Chuchura station. The Hooghly Ghat station is beside the Sampreeti Bridge which is a connector between the eastern and the western side of the Ganges. An extension of the Kolkata Metro from Howrah to Chuchura is under review.

Transportation in Chinsurah is mainly covered by bus, auto, rickshaw and toto. Private Buses from Chinsurah Court stand go to Chinsurah railway station (Bus no. 1) and other towns such as Dakshineswar (Bus no. 2), Memari (Bus no. 4), Jirat (Bus no. 8), Tarakeswar (Bus no. 17 and 23), Haripal (Bus no. 18) and Pandua (Bus no. 39). Besides Express Buses up to Bankura, Jangipara etc. are also available. Formerly bus to Arambagh, Bandar, Bardhaman, Barakar, Digha, Laugram, Kumarganj was available but due to insufficient passengers many of them are completely closed while some are short terminated and originated at Tarakeswar. According to many passengers because of so many illegal auto and toto routes, bus routes are closing. Auto service is provided to nearby towns and villages. Chinsurah Court-Chinsurah Railway Station, Chinsurah Court-Tribeni, Chinsurah Court-Bandel Junction Railway Station, Chinsurah Court-Hooghly railway station are the major auto routes in Hooghly-Chinsurah. Additionally, Chinsurah is well-connected to Naihati by ferry services. Grand Trunk Road and Delhi road passes through Chinsurah. Chinsurah-Dhaniakhali Road, Chinsurah Bansberia Road, MG Road, NS Road, Vivekananda Road are the important roads of Chinsurah. It is a well connected city by Road, Railway and waterways. Transport system of the city is excellent and affordable.

== Education ==
In 2020 Hooghly Chinsurah had 28 schools and 8 places of higher education. Notable institutions include:

=== Primary and secondary education ===
- Hooghly Branch Government School (established in 1834)
- Hooghly Collegiate School (established 1812), boys

=== Higher-education ===
- Hooghly Engineering and Technology College
- Hooghly Mohsin College
- Hooghly Women's College

== Festivals ==
Durga Puja, Jagadhatri Puja, Kartick Puja, Kali Puja & Deepawali, Ras Yatra, Saraswati Puja, Lakshmi Puja, Navabarsho (Bengali New Year), Basanti Puja, Manasa Puja, etc. are the main festivals celebrated in Chinsurah. Jagadhatri Puja or Mohish Mordini puja is a very famous festival. Every year it starts from Jamai Sasti and continues for four days like Durga Puja. The Mohish Mordini temple is situated in Dharampur, Chinsurah. The famous Gajan Festival is also celebrated at Sandeswartala Temple in Chinsurah near the bank of river Hooghly.

== Notable people ==
- Kalikananda Abadhut – Novelist
- Bankim Chandra Chatterjee – Novelist (wrote the national song of India)
- Sarat Chandra Chattopadhyay – Writer
- Bijoy Krishna Modak – Freedom Fighter
- Muhammad Mohsin – Philanthropist
- Bhudev Mukhopadhyay – Writer and intellectual
- Kazi Nuruzzaman - Bangladeshi Army Officer and Freedom fighter
- Titas Sadhu - Cricketer (Under-19 World Cup winner, Asian Games gold medallist)

== See also ==
- Colonial India
- Dutch Cemetery, Chinsurah
- Dutch India
- European colonies in India
- Hooghly Chinsurah Municipality

== Bibliography ==
- Dey, S. C., "Hooghly Past and Present", The Calcutta Review, Vol.96, No.191, (January 1893), pp.22-42; No.192, (April 1893), 276-288; Vol.97, No.193, (July 1893), pp.71-81; No.194, (October 1893), 340-366;Vol.98, No.195, (January 1894), pp.152-170; Vol.99, No.197, (July 1894), pp.153-164; Vol.104, No.208, (April 1897), pp.355-373.
