= Armenia (disambiguation) =

Armenia is a country in the South Caucasus region of Eurasia.

Armenia may also refer to:

== Places ==
=== Historical ===
- Armenian Soviet Socialist Republic (1922–1991), a former republic of the USSR
- First Republic of Armenia (1918–1920)
- Kingdom of Armenia (antiquity) (Greater Armenia), a kingdom from 331 BC to 428 AD
- Roman Armenia – parts of Greater Armenia controlled by the Roman Empire as an independent kingdom, client state, or Roman province during various periods of antiquity
- Byzantine Armenia (387–536 AD), parts of Greater Armenia controlled by the Byzantine Empire
- Armenian Kingdom of Cilicia, a state along the coast of the Mediterranean around the time of the Crusades
- Armenia (East Syriac diocese), a diocese of the Church of the East
- Zakarid Armenia (1201–1350), a vassal of the Kingdom of Georgia

=== Colombia ===
- Armenia, Colombia, a city in Quindío Department
- Armenia, Antioquia, a municipality in Antioquia Department

=== United States ===
- Armenia, Wisconsin
- Armenia Township, Pennsylvania
- Little Armenia, Los Angeles
- Armenia Gardens Estates, Tampa, Florida

=== Honduras ===
- Armenia Bonito, Atlántida, Atlántida Department
- Nueva Armenia, a municipality in department of Francisco Morazán

=== Other places ===
- Armenian Highlands, a plateau in West Asia sometimes known as Armenia
- Armenia, Belize, in Cayo District
- Armenia, Ecuador
- Armenia, Sonsonate, a municipality in El Salvador
- Armênia (São Paulo Metro), a station of the São Paulo Metro

== Other uses ==
- Soviet hospital ship Armenia, sunk on November 7, 1941
- Armenia (1796 ship), a merchant vessel launched at Calcutta in 1796
- 780 Armenia, a minor planet in the asteroid belt orbiting the Sun
- Gruppo Editoriale Armenia, an Italian publisher founded by Giovanni Armenia
- Armenia (album), an album by Vasilis Papakonstantinou
- Armenia (media), an Armenian newspaper
- Armenia, a former gossamer-winged butterfly genus, nowadays classified in Satyrium
- "Armenia", a song on the album Zeichnungen des Patienten O. T. by Einstürzende Neubauten
- United Armenia, an Armenian irredentist concept

== See also ==
- Armenian (disambiguation)
- List of places named after Armenia
- Armenio, a village, former municipality and ancient city in the Larissa regional unit, Thessaly, Greece
- Amenia (disambiguation)
