= Armenian Street =

Armenian Street may refer to:

- Armenian Street in George Town, Penang, Malaysia
- Armenian Street in Singapore
- Armenian Street, Chennai in India

== See also ==
- List of places named after Armenia
- Little Armenia (disambiguation)
- Roads in Armenia
- Armenia Avenue, Tampa, Florida, USA
