= Armeno (disambiguation) =

Armeno is a comune (municipality) in Italy. Armeno may also refer to

- Armenian (disambiguation)
- San Gregorio Armeno, a church and a monastery in Naples, Italy
- Cristoforo Armeno
- Gennaro Armeno (born 1994), Italian football midfielder
- Armeno-Tats, distinct group of Christian Tat-speaking Armenians
