= Armenian Republic (disambiguation) =

Armenian Republic may refer to:

- First Republic of Armenia (1918-1920), officially known as Republic of Armenia
- Republic of Mountainous Armenia (1921)
- Armenian Soviet Socialist Republic (Armenian SSR) (1920–1922, 1936–1991), also known as Soviet Armenia or the Second Republic of Armenia
- Armenian Republic, present-day Armenia (1991-present)

== See also ==
- Republic of Artsakh previously known as Nagorno-Karabakh Republic, a breakaway de facto Armenian state and republic (1994-present)
