= Orthodoxy in Armenia =

The term Orthodoxy in Armenia may refer to:

- Eastern Orthodoxy in Armenia, representing adherents, communities and institutions of various Eastern Orthodox Churches, in Armenia
- Oriental Orthodoxy in Armenia, representing adherents, communities and institutions of various Oriental Orthodox Churches, in Armenia

== See also ==
- Orthodoxy (disambiguation)
- Armenia (disambiguation)
- Orthodox Church (disambiguation)
