= List of places named after Armenia =

Places named after Armenia

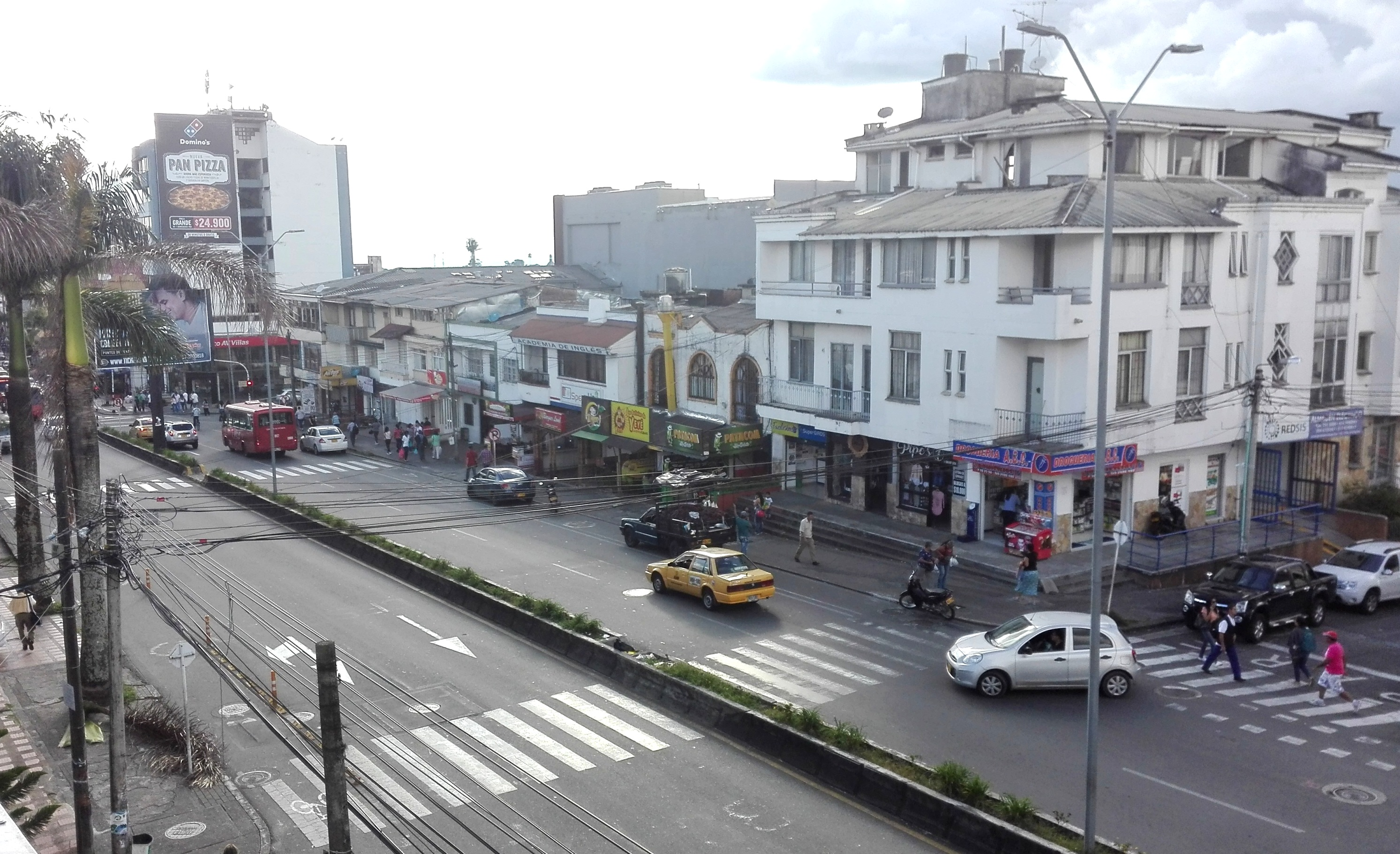
Armenia, Colombia, a town of 300,000 is the largest town in the world named Armenia.

Numerous cities, towns, villages and streets around the world are named after Armenia. Some of them are listed below.

== Settlements ==
Africa

- Armen Sefer, Addis Ababa, Ethiopia

Americas

- Armenia, Belize
- Armenia, Beni Department, Bolivia
- Armenia, Antioquia, Colombia
- Armenia, Colombia
- Armenia, Baraya, Colombia
- Armenia, Ecuador
- Armenia, Orellana Province, Ecuador
- Armenia, Sonsonate, El Salvador
- Nueva Armenia, Honduras
- Armenia Bonito, Atlántida, Honduras
- (United States) Armenia, Chester County, South Carolina
- (United States) Armenia, Wisconsin
- (United States) Armenia Gardens Estates, Tampa, Florida
- (United States) Armenia Township, Pennsylvania
- (United States) Little Armenia, East Hollywood, Los Angeles, California
- (United States) Old Armenian Town, Fresno, California

Asia

- Armanitola, Dhaka, Bangladesh
- (Israel) Armenian Quarter of the Old City of Jerusalem
- Armenikend, Baku, Azerbaijan (formerly)
- Armenia, Masbate City, Philippines

Europe

- Armenades, Corfu, Greece
- Armavir, Russia
- Armeniș, Romania
- Armenoi, Crete, Greece
- San Lazzaro degli Armeni, Italy
- Armyansk, Crimea, Ukraine
- Armyanskiy, Apsheronskiy rayon, Krasnodar Krai, Russia
- Armyanskiy, Krymskiy rayon, Krasnodar Krai, Russia
- Gherla, Romania - was once known as Armenopolis
- Örményes, Hungary
- Ormos Armenis (Όρμος Αρμένης), Oia, Greece
- Urmeniș, Romania

== Streets and squares ==
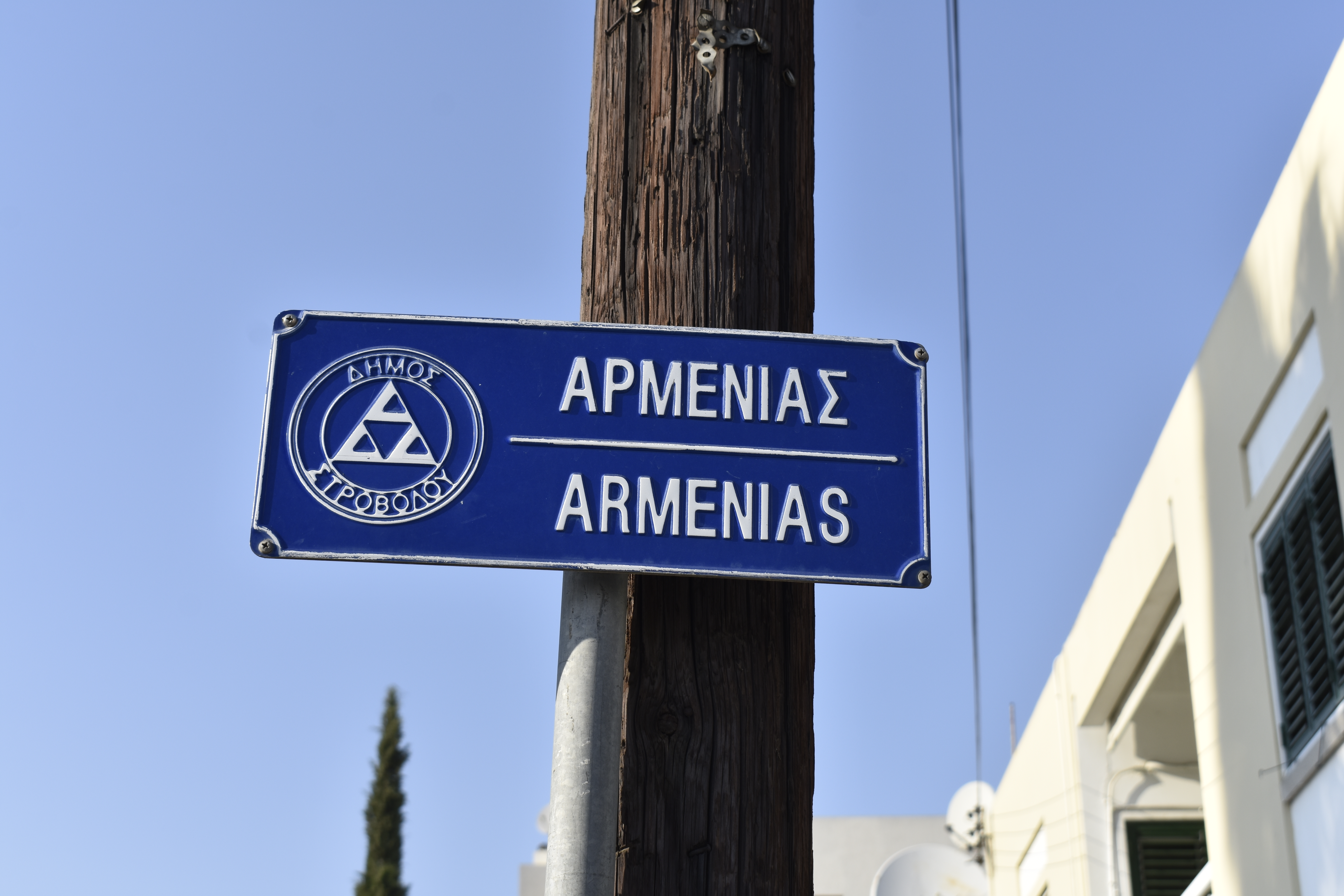
Armenias Street in Nicosia, Cyprus.

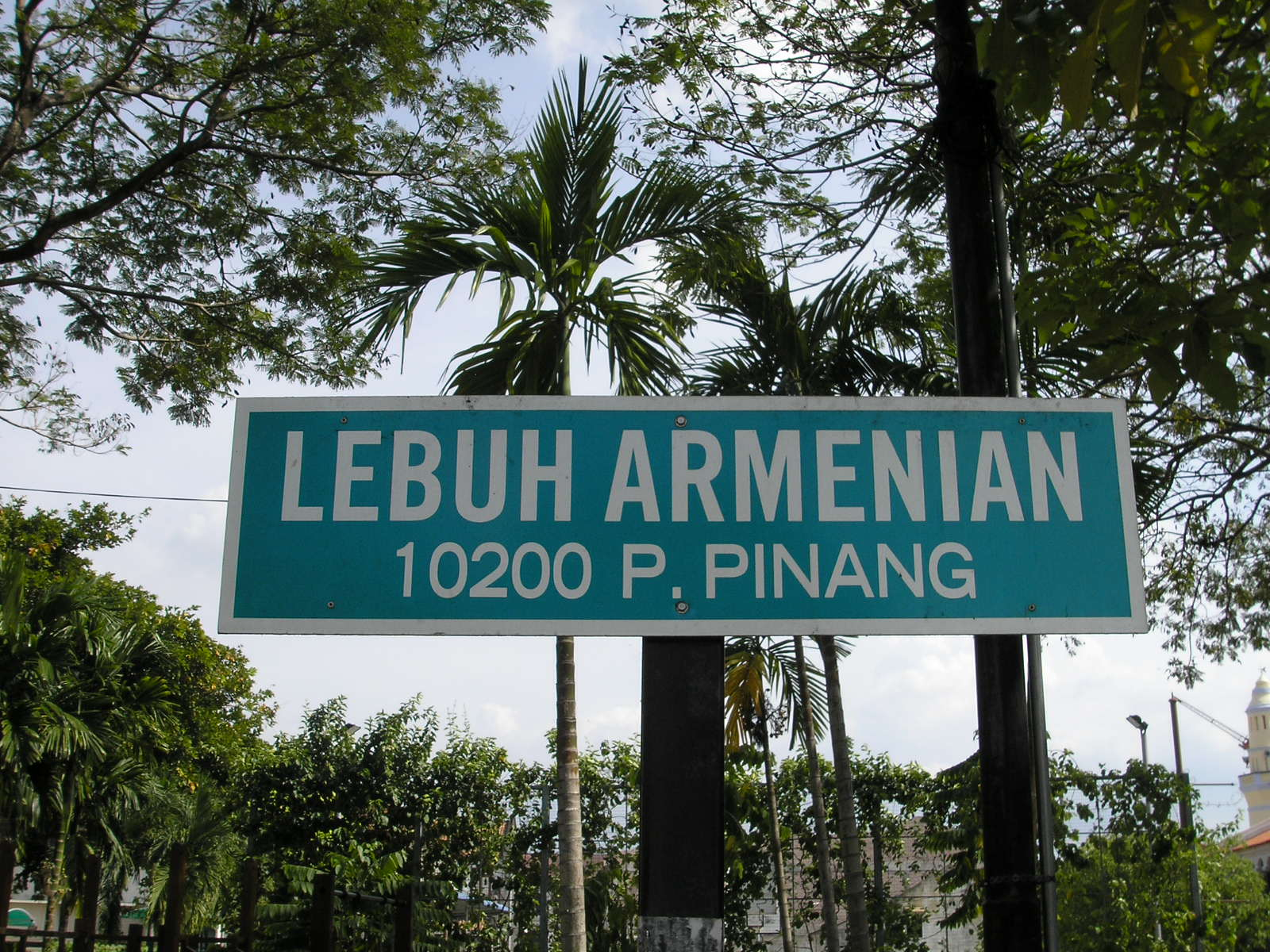
Armenian Street in George Town, Penang, Malaysia

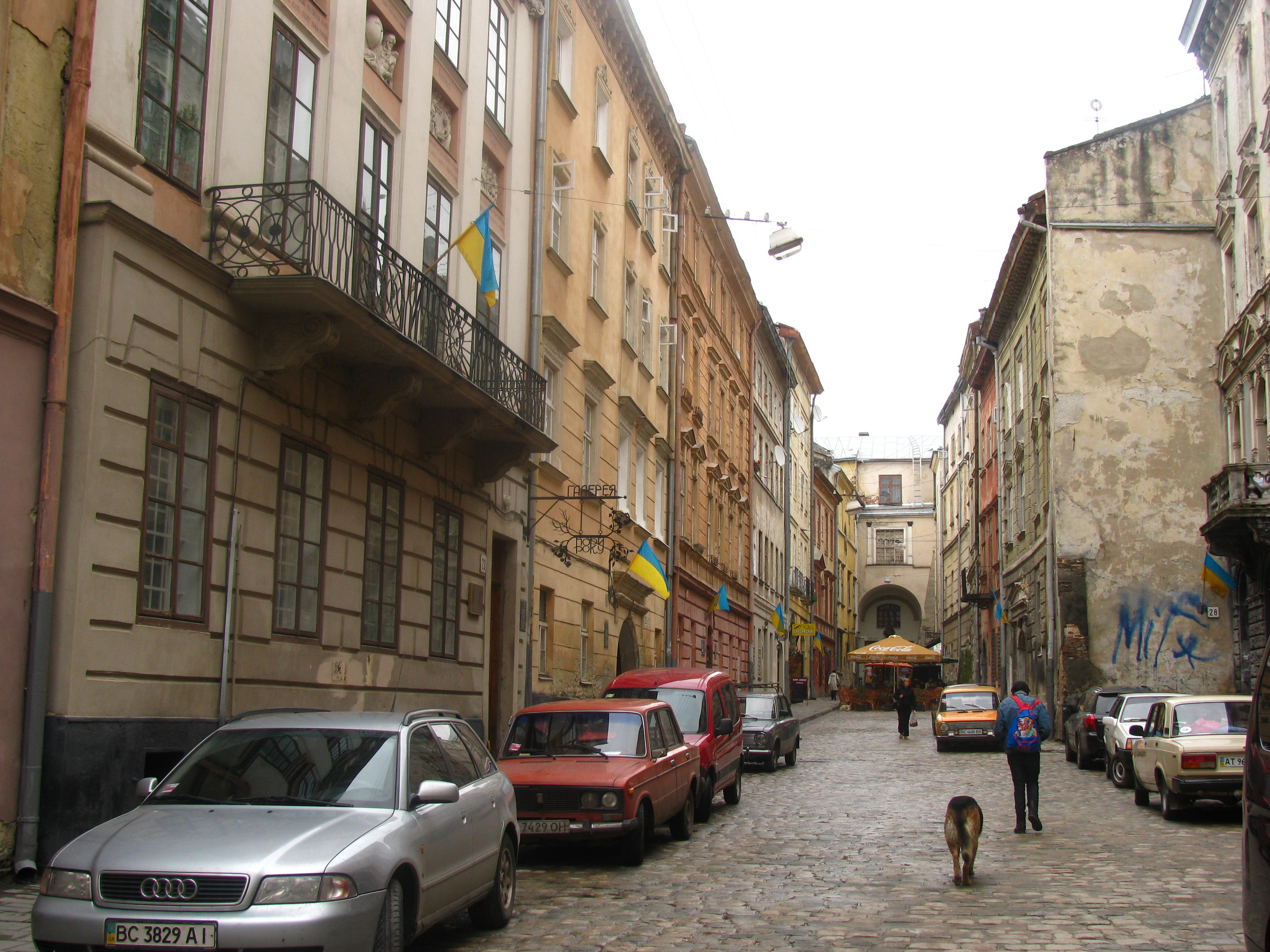
Armenian Street in Lviv's Old Town

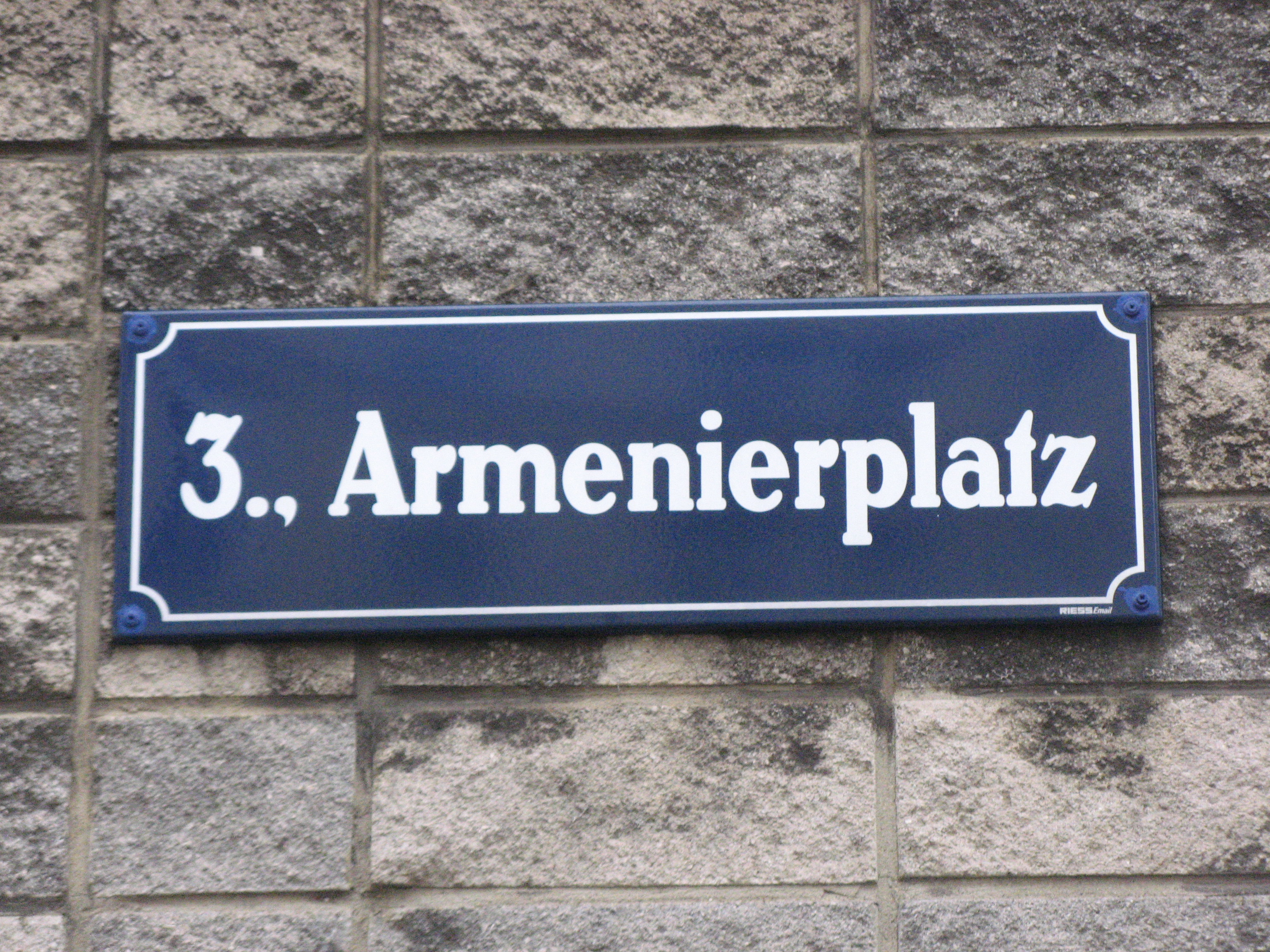
Armenian Square (Armenierplatz) in Vienna, Austria

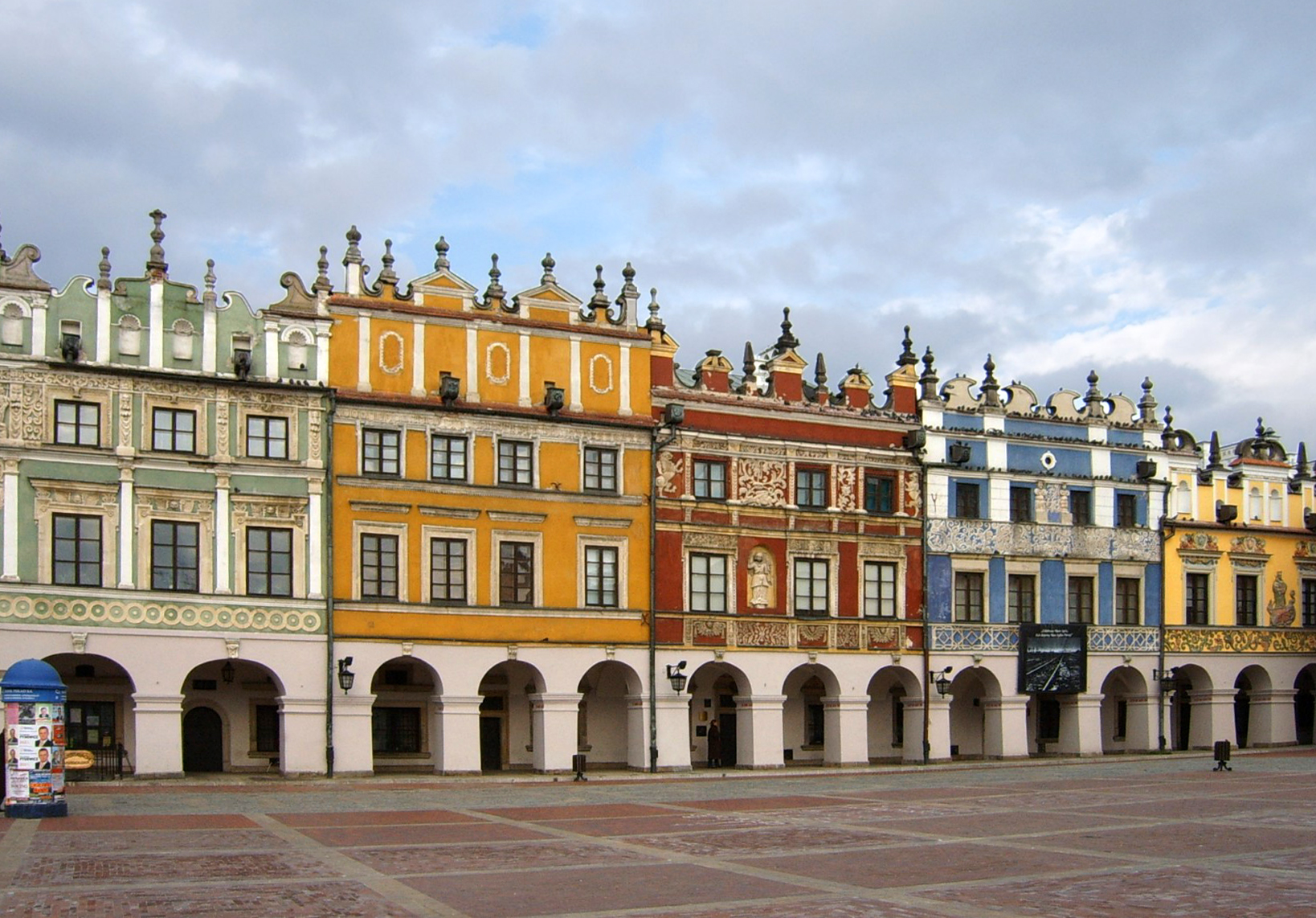
The Armenian Houses of Zamość, Poland built by 17th century Armenian merchants

Name	Location	Ref
Armenia Drive	Bedford, Nova Scotia, Canada	
Armenia Street	Beirut, Lebanon	
Armenische Straße	Berlin, Germany	
ulice Arménská	Bratislava, Slovakia	
Armeniensvej	Copenhagen, Denmark	
ulice Arménská	Brno, Czech Republic	
Strada Armenească	Bucharest, Romania	
Örmény utca	Budapest, Hungary	
Plaza Inmigrantes de Armenia	Buenos Aires, Argentina	
Calle Armenia	Buenos Aires, Argentina	
Rue d'Armenie	Casablanca, Morocco	
Armenia Square	Geneva, Switzerland	
Armenian Street	Chennai, India	
Virmens'ka St.	Chernivtsi, Ukraine	
Strada Armenească	Chișinău, Moldova	
Rue d'Armenie	Clamart, France	
Virmens'ka Ln	Dnipro, Ukraine	
Esplanade d'Arménie	Paris, France	
Rue Armenia	Dollard-des-Ormeaux, Quebec, Canada	
Calle Armenia	El Ejido, Spain	
Armyanskaya Ulytsa	(Autonomous Republic of Crimea) Feodosia, Crimea	
Avenue d'Arménie	Gardanne, France	
Zaułek Ormiański	Gdańsk, Poland	
Armenian Street	George Town, Penang, Malaysia	
Strada Armenească	Gherla, Romania	
Rue d'Arménie	Grenoble, France	
Armyanskaya Ulitsa	Grozny, Russia	
Str. Armenească	Ineu, Romania	
Virmens'ka St	Ivano-Frankivsk, Ukraine	
Armenian Market Square	Kamianets-Podilskyi, Ukraine	
Virmens'kyi Ln	Kharkiv, Ukraine	
Armyanskaya Ulitsa	Kizlyar, Russia	
Virmenska vulytsya (Вірменська вулиця)	Kyiv, Ukraine	
ulice Arménská	Kladno, Czech Republic	
Armenian Street	Kolkata, India	
Armenias Street	Larnaca, Cyprus	
Armenias Street	Limassol, Cyprus	
Armenias Street	Livadhia, Cyprus	
Str. Armenească	Lunca, Romania	
Vulytsya Virmenska (Вулиця Вірменська)	Lviv, Ukraine	
Rue d'Arménie	Lyon, France	
Calle de León V de Armenia	Madrid, Spain	
Str. Armenească	Mioveni, Romania	
Str. Armeneasca	Mogoșoaia, Romania	
Virmens'ka St	Molodizhne, Ukraine	
Plaza Armenia	Montevideo, Uruguay	
Armyanskiy pereulok (Армянский переулок)	Moscow, Russia	
Armyanskaya Ulitsa	Mozdok, Russia	
Via San Gregorio Armeno	Naples, Italy	
Rue d'Arménie	Nice, France	
Armenias Street	Nicosia, Cyprus	
Virmens'kyi Ln	Odessa, Ukraine	
Rua Armênia	Porto, Portugal	
ulice Arménská	Prague, Czech Republic	
Plaza Armenia	Puerto Williams, Chile	
Armenia Way	Queens, New York, United States	
Rua Armênia	Ribeirão das Neves, Brazil	
Rua Armênia	Rio de Janeiro, Brazil	
Piazza Armenia	Rome, Italy	
Armayanskaya ulitsa (Армянская улица)	Rostov-on-Don, Russia	
Rua Armênia	São Paulo, Brazil	
Rua Armênia	São Paulo, Brazil	
Rua Armênia	São Paulo, Brazil	
Calle Armenia	Sevilla, Spain	
Armenian Road	Sherman, New York, United States	
Armenian Street	Singapore	
Strada Armenească	Suceava, Romania	
ulice Arménská	Svitavy, Czech Republic	
North Armenia Avenue	Tampa, Florida, United States	
Virmens'ka St	Valence, France	
Rue d'Arménie	Valence, France	
Sotoportego dei Armeni	Venice, Italy	
Armenierplatz	Vienna, Austria	
Armenias Street	Vironas, Greece	
Armayanskaya ulitsa (Армянская улица)	Vladikavkaz, Russia	
Armyanskaya Ulitsa	Volvograd, Russia	
Ormiańska street	Zamość, Poland	

== Other ==
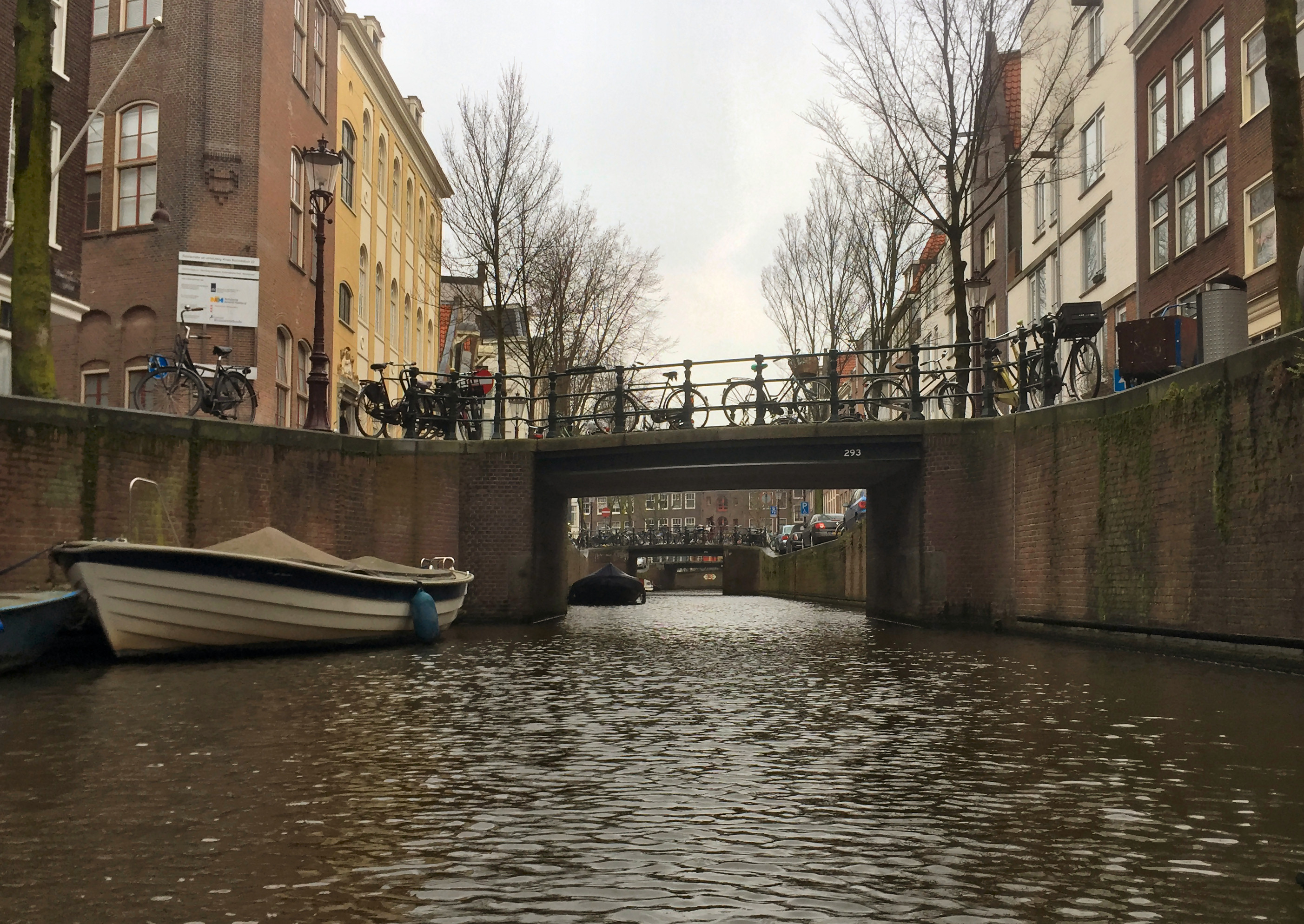
Armenian Bridge (Armeensebrug) and Armenian Apostolic Church (the yellow building on the left) in Amsterdam, Netherlands

Metro stations

- (Brazil) Armênia, a São Paulo Metro station

Parks

- (United States) Armenian Heritage Park, Boston, Massachusetts
- (France) Parc de l'Arménie, Montpellier
- (Canada) Parc de l'Arménie, Montreal
- (France) Jardin d'Erevan, Paris
- Plaza Armenia, Piriápolis, Uruguay

Rivers

- Ormeniș, tributary of the Mureș in Transylvania, Romania
- Ormeniș, tributary of the Olt, Romania

Other

- Armeensebrug (Armenian Bridge), Amsterdam, Netherlands
- Arméniers arm (Armenian Bridge), Sorgues, France
- Armenia Dam, in the Leeu River, near Hobhouse, Free State, South Africa

== See also ==
- List of Armenian ethnic enclaves
