= Vittorio Curtoni =

Italian writer

Vittorio Curtoni (28 July 1949 – 4 October 2011) was an Italian science fiction writer and translator.

== Biography ==
Curtoni was born at San Pietro in Cerro, in the province of Piacenza, and entered the Italian science fiction world at a very young age. In 1970 he was co-editor of Galassia, a series publishing science fiction novels and anthologies, together with Gianni Montanari. Later he edited the magazine Robot, published by Armenia, from April 1976 to October 1978, as well as its short-lived successor for the same publisher, Aliens.

Curtoni frequently translated English language novels for Urania and other Italian science fiction series. He also wrote numerous short stories, some of which collected in Ciao Futuro, published in Urania in 2001.

Before his death, caused by a sudden heart attack, Curtoni was editing a new incarnation of Robot, published by Delos Books, and collaborating with the online and magazine Delos and with the Piacenza newspaper Libertà.

== Bibliography ==
- Dove stiamo volando (1972)
- Le frontiere dell'ignoto. Vent'anni di fantascienza italiana (essay, 1977)
- La sindrome lunare e altre storie (short story collection, 1978)
- Retrofuturo (1999)
- Ciao futuro (short story collection, 2001)
- Trappole in libertà (2004)
- Bianco su nero (2011)

== Sources ==
- Iannuzzi, Giulia, Fantascienza italiana. Riviste, autori, dibattiti dagli anni Cinquanta agli anni Settanta, Milan-Udine, Mimesis, 2014, pp. 185–195, 281–324, ISBN 9788857521503.
- Ead., Distopie, viaggi spaziali, allucinazioni. Fantascienza italiana contemporanea, Milano-Udine, Mimesis, 2015, chapter 4, ISBN 9788857527659.
- Iannuzzi, Giulia, Pagetti, Carlo, Italy, in SFE. The Encyclopedia of Science Fiction, edited by John Clute, David Langford, Peter Nicholls, 11 January 2015.
