= St. Mary's Co-Cathedral, Chennai =

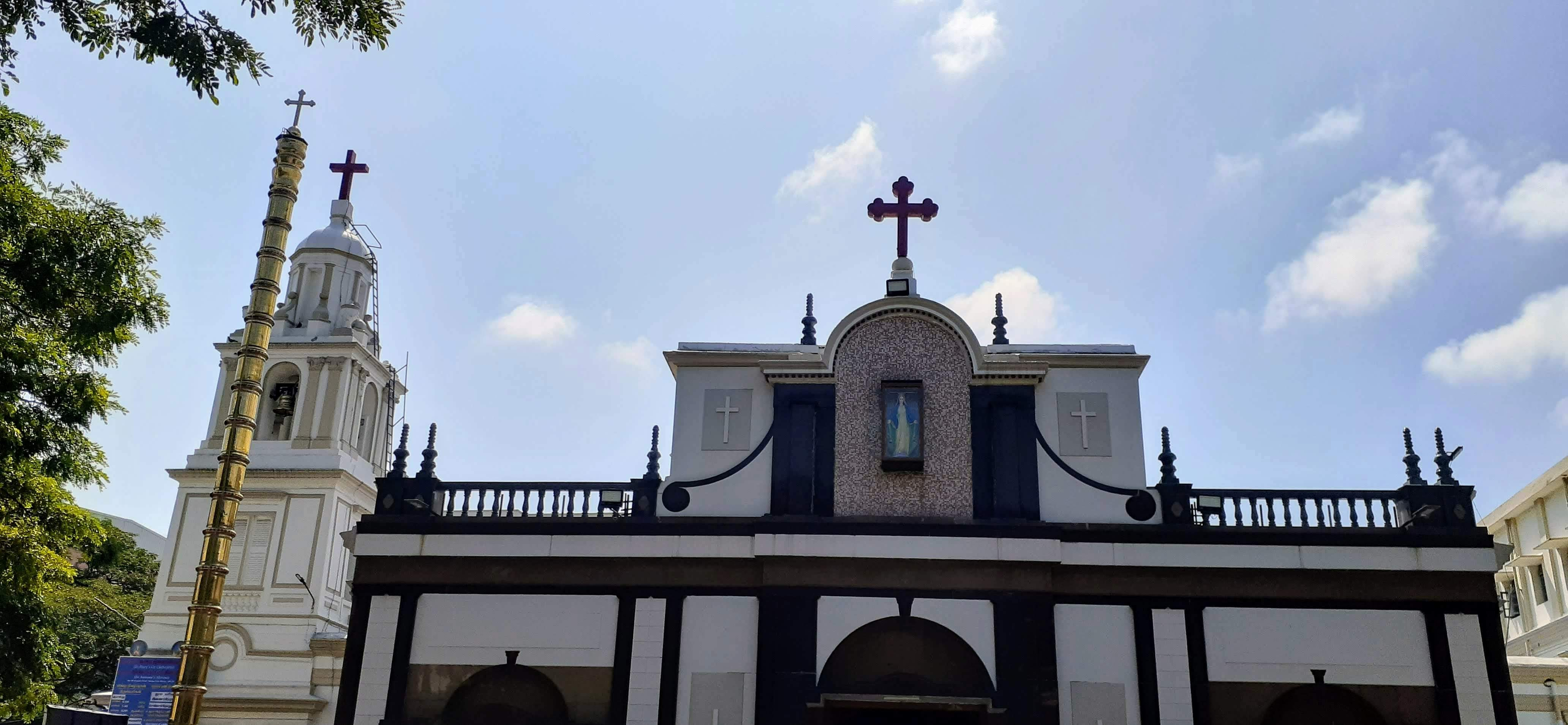
- Elegant view of the church
- St. Mary's Co-Cathedral, Chennai
- 13°05′23″N 80°17′15″E
- Location: Armenian Street, Parrys corner, Chennai, Tamil Nadu
- Country: India
- Denomination: Roman Catholic
- Churchmanship: Latin

History
- Status: Co-cathedral

Architecture
- Functional status: Active

Administration
- Archdiocese: Archdiocese of Madras and Mylapore

St. Mary's Co-Cathedral is a Roman Catholic co-cathedral in Armenian Street, Parrys corner, Chennai, Tamil Nadu, India. Constructed by Capuchins in 1658, it is one of the oldest churches in the former British India. For a long time Cathedral of the diocese it received the title of co-cathedral when the seat of the Roman Catholic Archdiocese of Madras and Mylapore was transferred to San Thome Basilica.

== History ==
According to records, the church was constructed by a French Capuchin Father Ephrem de Nevers, the First Missionary of Madras who put up "the open pandall chappell" in Armenian Street in 1658. The structure, however, did not survive for long and had to be reconstructed in 1692. The church was renovated in 1775 and 1785 and promoted to the status of the cathedral of the Ecclesiastical Province of Madras in 1886. When, in 1952, the ecclesiastical provinces of Madras and Mylapore were merged to form the Roman Catholic Archdiocese of Madras and Mylapore with the San Thome Basilica as the headquarters, St. Mary's was given the status of a co-cathedral.

== See also ==
- Religion in Chennai
- Catholic Church in India
