= Little Armenia =

Little Armenia can refer to:

- The region Lesser Armenia
- The Armenian Kingdom of Cilicia, in the above region
- an Armenian quarter in a city, notably:
  - Little Armenia, Los Angeles

== See also ==
- List of places named after Armenia
