= Gokhale Hall =

Building in Chennai, India

Coordinates: 13.091564°N 80.287861°E

The Gopal Krishna Gokhale Hall is a public hall situated in Armenian Street, Georgetown, Chennai. It was constructed by Annie Besant in 1915 as the headquarters of the Young Men's Indian Association.

== History ==
The Gokhale Hall was founded as the Young Men's Indian Association Hall by theosophist and Indian independence activist Annie Besant, the Theosophist, social reformer and Indian nationalist. in 1915. Annie Besant announced the formation of the Home Rule League in 1916 at the hall. It was later renamed as Gopal Krishna Gokhale Hall after Indian leader Gopal Krishna Gokhale, founder of the Servants of India Society, patriot, social reformer and a pioneer in education.

In later days, Gokhale Hall served as a venue for music concerts. The Tamil Isai Sangam functioned from Gokhale Hall from 1944 to 1953.
