= Armenian Street, Chennai =

Street in Chennai, India

Coordinates: 13.0927°N 80.2883°E

Armenian Street
- Aranmanaikaaran Street
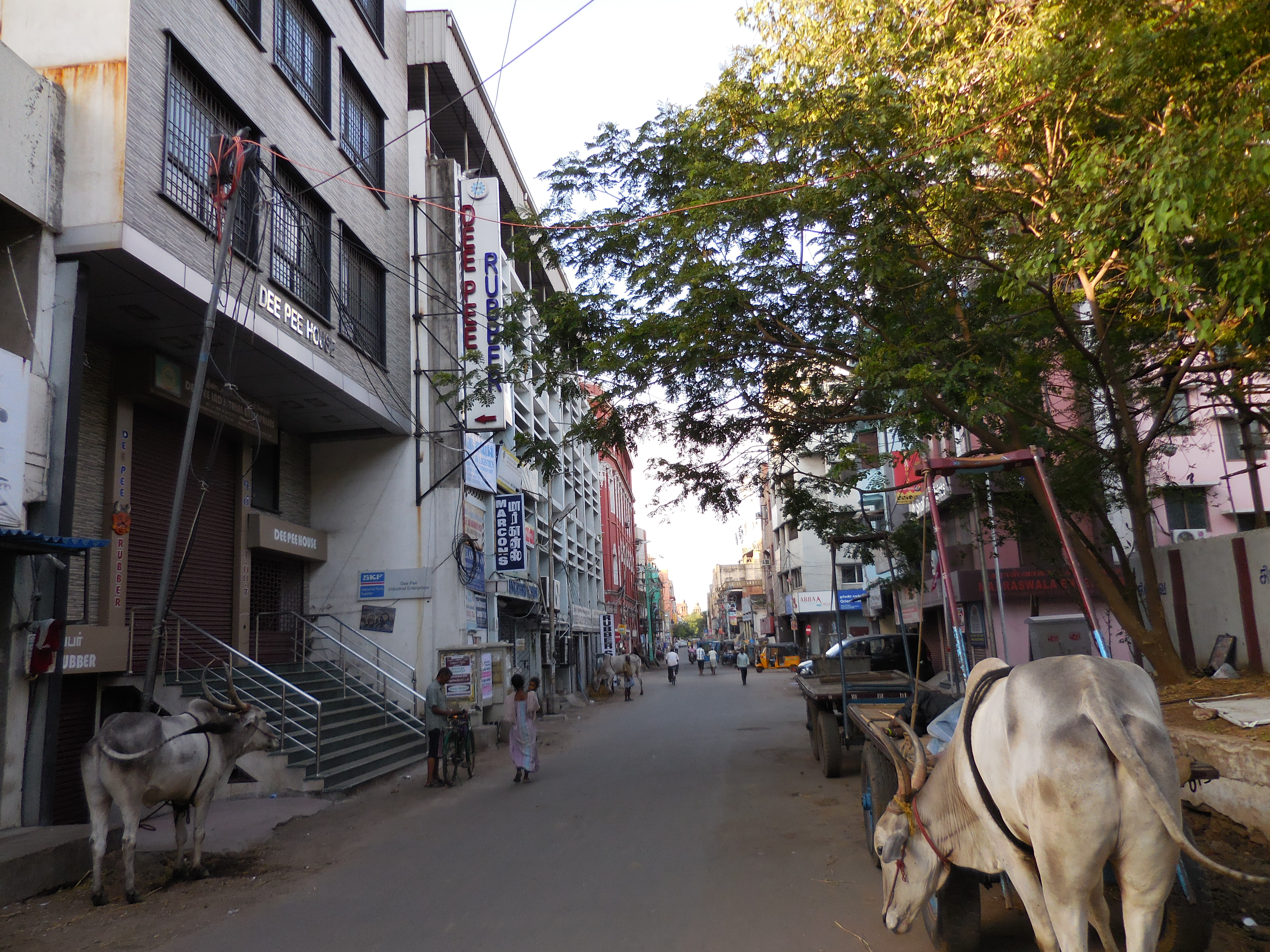
- View of Armenian Street towards the south, with the Madras High Court dome visible at the southern end
- Interactive map of Armenian Street
- Native name: அரண்மனைக்காரன் தெரு (Tamil)
- Maintained by: Corporation of Chennai
- Length: 0.6 mi (0.97 km)
- South end: China Bazaar Road, Parry's Corner, George Town, Chennai
- North end: Mannady Street, Chennai

Armenian Street, locally known as Aranmanaikaran Street, is one of the historical streets of the commercial centre of George Town in Chennai, India. The road runs north–south and connects Mannady Street in the north with the China Bazaar Road (NSC Bose Road) in the south. The street is dotted with several century-old historical structures.

The street is named for the Armenians, who were some of the early settlers in the city of Madras. Several moved to the long street of the commercial neighbourhood of George Town in the 1750s, eventually making the street bear their name. The locals, however, corrupted the name to Aranmanaikaran Street, which means the 'street of the palace people'.

== History ==
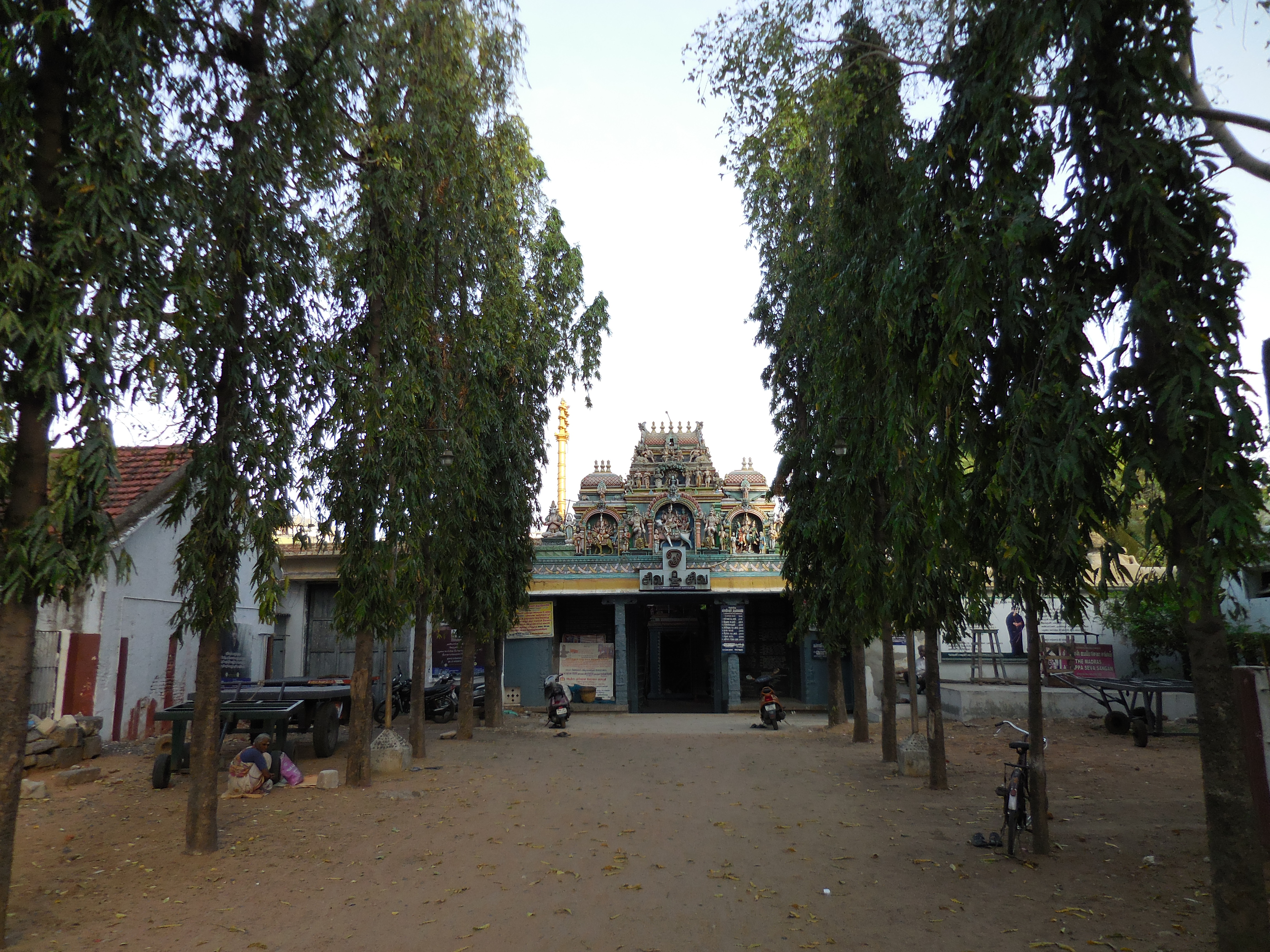
Kacchaaleeshwarar Temple, one of the oldest temples in the street

The earliest existence of Armenians in India dates back to the late 8th century with the arrival of Thomas Cana along the Malabar Coast in 780 CE. Although not much is known about his origin or mission, Portraits of Hope: Armenians in the Contemporary World by Huberta Von Voss indicates that he was lauded for his work for the rebirth of Christianity. However, it was not until the 1660s that the Armenian presence in Madras became eminent. According to Madras: The Land, The People and Their Governance by S. Muthiah, the earliest Armenian tombstone in the city is of Coja David Margar found near Little Mount, which dates back to 1663.Coja Petrus Uscan was a prominent Philanthropist Armenian of the Chennai Armenian community in the 17th century. The Armenians of Madras were believed to be the first to discover the sepulchre of St. Thomas upon the Mount in the 16th century. He built the Marmalong bridge and gifted it to the public. Although the time when Armenians began settling down in the city remains obscure, records clearly suggest that the Armenians monopolised trade between India and West Asia on the one hand and Manila, a Spanish bastion then, on the other. Their main trades included silk, spices and gems. Three Chennai based Armenian families still visit the Armenian church in Armenian street to preserve their cultural heritage.

== Historical buildings along the street ==
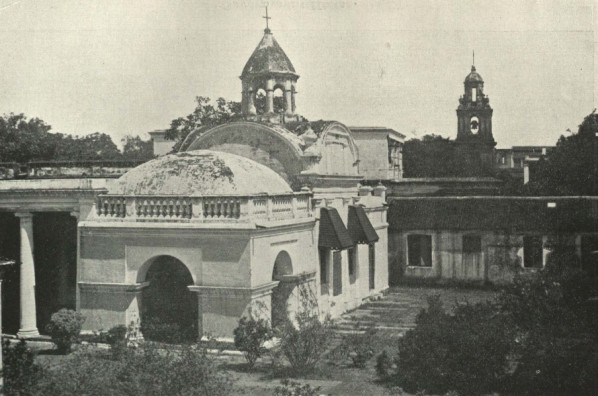
The Armenian Church of St. Mary, c. 1905

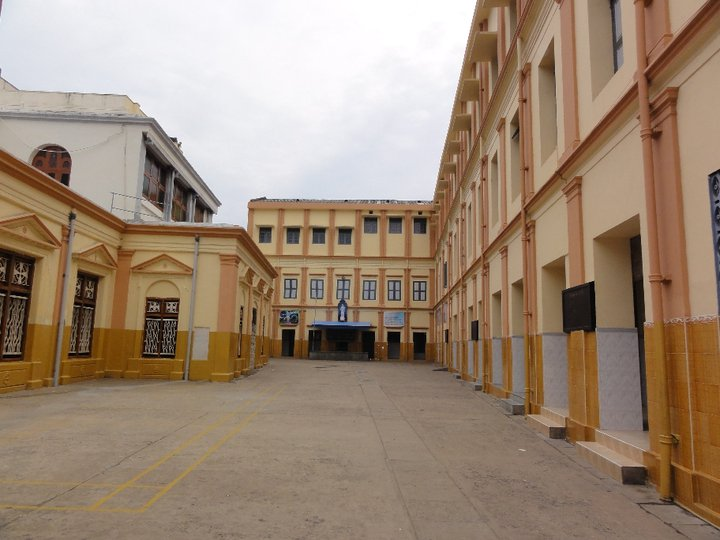
St. Mary's Anglo-Indian Higher Secondary School

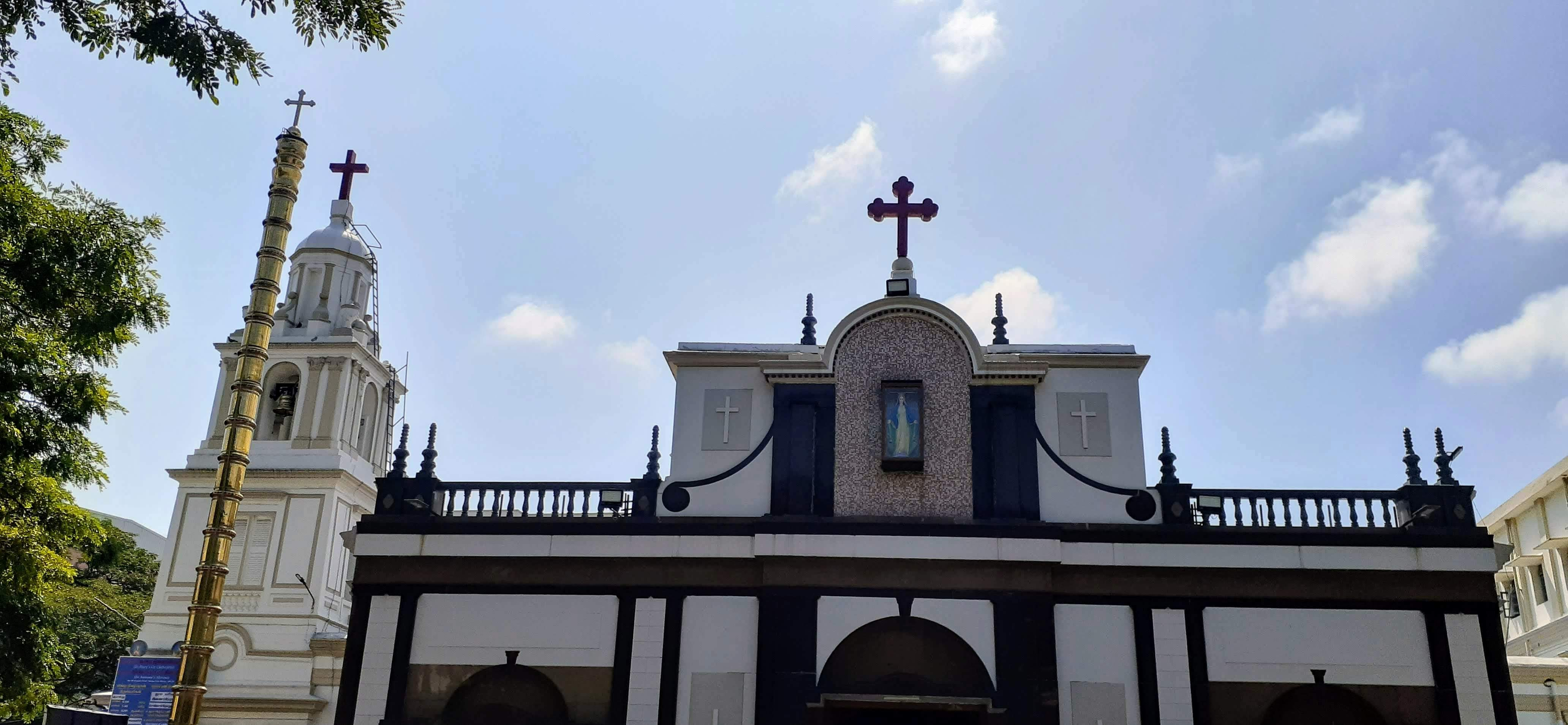
View of St. Mary's Co-cathedral Church

The long and narrow street houses several historically important buildings, including several places of worship. The Armenian Church is perhaps the most visible Armenian monument in the city. It was first built in 1712 and later rebuilt after the French siege in 1772. The first church was built of timber in the present High Court area after obtaining permission from the East India Company. The East India Company gave the Armenians 50 pounds towards managing the expenses of the church, which encouraged more traders to settle in and around the church. In Vestiges of Old Madras, H. D. Love points out that the earliest Armenian church, situated in Old Black Town, as shown in Thomas Pitt's map, was probably built shortly after the Company entered into a covenant with the Armenian residents in India. The new church, however, was consecrated in Aga Shawmier's chapel grounds in George Town. It is the church that gave the street its name. The church has the biggest bells in the city, each weighing 200 kg and the oldest two dating back to 1754 and 1778, and its altar belongs to an earlier Armenian church that was near the Madras High Court. Two other bells were gifted by Eliazar Shawmier and the remaining two are from 1837. The church complex also served as a cemetery for the Armenian population in the city. Reverend Haroutiun Shmavonian, the founder, publisher and editor of the world's first Armenian periodical 'Azdarar', is buried here. Today, the Armenian church complex is managed by an Armenian trust based in Kolkata.

The St Mary's Co-Cathedral abutting the church dates from 1658, which became the Cathedral of Madras in 1886. The cathedral has several old oil paintings. The church's Parish Hall hosted several Tamil music concerts of the Tamil Isai Sangam in the 1940s, when orthodox groups opposed the move to propagate Tamil songs in Carnatic music, which had several musical icons of the day such as M. S. Subbulakshmi, K. B. Sundarambal and M. K. Thyagaraja Bhagavathar singing in it. The Tamil Isai Sangam functioned from Gokhale Hall from 1944 to 1953. St. Mary's Anglo-Indian Higher Secondary School, one of the oldest schools in India and one of the first five schools to be set up during the British period, is located adjacent to St Mary's Co-Cathedral and is established in 1839.

The most visible Armenian monument in Chennai is the much-written about Armenian church, which was first built in 1712 and later rebuilt after the French siege in 1772. The first church was built of timber in the present High Court area with permission from the East India Company. The Armenians were given 50 pounds to manage the expenses of the church. This encouraged more traders to settle in and around the area. Vestiges of Old Madras by H.D. Love points out that the earliest Armenian church, situated in Old Black Town, as shown in Thomas Pitt's map, was probably built shortly after the Company entered into a covenant with the Armenian residents in India. The new church, however, was consecrated in Aga Shawmier's chapel grounds in George Town. The street on which the church is situated continues to be called the Armenian Street, where the settlers once lived.

The street is home to the Kachchaleswarar Temple built in 1725 by Kalavai Chetty, a 'dubash' working for the British East India Company, on a land belonging to him.

The street is also the headquarters of Binny's, a leading business establishment of the city from 1799 till its closure in the 1990s, which moved the office to the area in 1812. The headquarters building is a classic structure with curved verandahs, huge halls and teak wood stairs. However, the fate of the building remains obscure since the closure of the organisation.

The headquarters building of the Young Men's Indian Association (YMIA), built by Annie Besant in 1915, is located next to Binny's. The building also housed an oratory called the Gokhale Hall, which, in time, became a venue for public meetings and performances by public artists. The age-old building is now expected to be demolished.

== See also ==
- Parry's Corner
- George Town
- Armenians in India
- List of places named after Armenia
- History of Chennai

== Bibliography ==
- Muthiah, S. (1981). Madras Discovered. East West Books (Madras) Pvt Ltd. p. 124.
