= Armenia Gardens Estates =

- Neighborhood
- Location within the state of Florida
- Coordinates: 28°0′58″N 82°28′50″W
- Country: United States
- State: Florida
- County: Hillsborough
- City: Tampa

Population (2010)
  - Total: 2,980
- Time zone: UTC-5 (Eastern (EST))
  - Summer (DST): UTC-4 (EDT)
- ZIP codes: 33604 and 33614

Armenia Gardens Estates is a neighborhood within the city limits of Tampa, Florida. As of the 2010 census the neighborhood had a population of 2,980. The ZIP Codes serving the neighborhood are 33604 and 33614.

== Geography ==
Armenia Gardens Estates boundaries are Sligh Avenue to the south, Waters Avenue to the north, Rome Avenue to the east, and the unincorporated community of Egypt Lake to the west.

== Demographics ==
Source: Hillsborough County Atlas

At the 2010 census there were 2,980 people and 1,110 households residing in the neighborhood. The population density was 4,750/mi^{2}. The racial makeup of the neighborhood was 77% White, 9% African American, 0% Native American, 3% Asian, 7% from other races and 3% from two or more races. Hispanic or Latino of any race were 49%.

Of the 1,110 households 27% had children under the age of 18 living with them, 42% were married couples living together, 16% had a female householder with no husband present, and 8% were non-families. 27% of households were made up of individuals.

The age distribution was 22% under the age of 18, 20% from 18 to 34, 22% from 35 to 49, 20% from 50 to 64, and 17% 65 or older. For every 100 females, there were 102.6 males.

The per capita income for the neighborhood was $15,869. About 13% of the population were below the poverty line, 22% of those were under the age of 18.

== See also ==
- Neighborhoods in Tampa, Florida
- List of places named after Armenia
