= Gruppo Editoriale Armenia =

Armenia Edizioni is an Italian publisher founded by Giovanni Armenia in 1972. Armenia specializes in two areas: one deals with fantasy novels, the other concerns paranormal phenomena, astrology and new age. It also publishes several books dealing with oriental philosophies and styles of life, as well as essays of pedagogy and psychology. Armenia is also the publisher of the Italian editions of Louise Hay's books.

== Fantasy and science-fiction ==
During the 1970s, Armenia published one of the most popular Italian science-fiction magazines, Robot, edited by Vittorio Curtoni, as well as a series of novels issued under the same label.

Armenia was one of the first publishers in Italy to publish novels in the fantasy genre. Among its most important fantasy series are Dragonlance and Forgotten Realms; authors published by Armenia include Margaret Weis, Tracy Hickman, R. A. Salvatore, Jean Rabe, Terry Brooks, Ed Greenwood, and Richard A. Knaak.
