= Republic of Mountainous Armenia =

Unrecognized state in Caucasia (1921)

Republic of Mountainous Armenia Լեռնահայաստանի Հանրապետութիւն (Armenian)
- 1921
- Coat of arms

- A map of the republic's situation.
- Status: Unrecognized state
- Capital: Goris (de facto)
- Common languages: Armenian (de facto)
- Demonym: Armenian
- Government: Republic
- Prime Minister
  - 1921: Garegin Nzhdeh
  - 1921: Simon Vratsian
- History
  - February Uprising: 18 Feb – 2 Apr 1921
  - Declared: 26 April 1921
  - Disestablished: 13 July 1921
Preceded by	Succeeded by
First Republic of Armenia	Armenian Soviet Socialist Republic; Azerbaijan Soviet Socialist Republic
- Today part of: Armenia; Azerbaijan

The Republic of Mountainous Armenia (Armenian: Լեռնահայաստանի Հանրապետութիւն, romanized: Leṙnahayastani Hanrapetut’yun), also known as simply Mountainous Armenia (Լեռնահայաստան, Leṙnahayastan), was an anti-Bolshevik Armenian state roughly corresponding with the territory that is now the present-day Armenian provinces of Vayots Dzor and Syunik, and some parts of the present-day Republic of Azerbaijan (in particular, Nakhchivan Autonomous Republic) in the west. It was established by military commander and Armenian political thinker Garegin Nzhdeh and his allies with the support of local guerrilla forces, following the suppression of the February Uprising in April 1921. It was not recognized by any country but existed until mid-July of the same year.

== Background ==
=== Post World War I ===
Following World War I, the signing of the Treaty of Sèvres, and in the ensuing peace negotiations in Paris, the Allies had vowed to punish the Young Turks and reward some, if not all, of the eastern provinces of the empire to the nascent Armenian Republic. However, the Allies were more concerned with concluding the peace treaties with Germany and the other European members of the Central Powers. In matters related to the Near East, the principal western powers, Great Britain, France, Italy and the United States, had conflicting interests over the spheres of influence they were to assume. While there were crippling internal disputes between the Allies, the United States was reluctant to accept a mandate over Armenia. Meanwhile, the recently formed Russian Soviet Federative Socialist Republic and Turkish National Movement had both set their sights on taking over the Caucasus, including Armenia. The Bolsheviks sympathized with the Turkish Movement due to their mutual opposition to the western powers, or "Western Imperialism", as the Bolsheviks referred to it. The Soviet government allied with the Turkish nationalists and sent them gold and weapons. This proved disastrous for the Armenians, and eventually Western Armenia fell to the invading forces.

=== Sovietization of Armenia ===
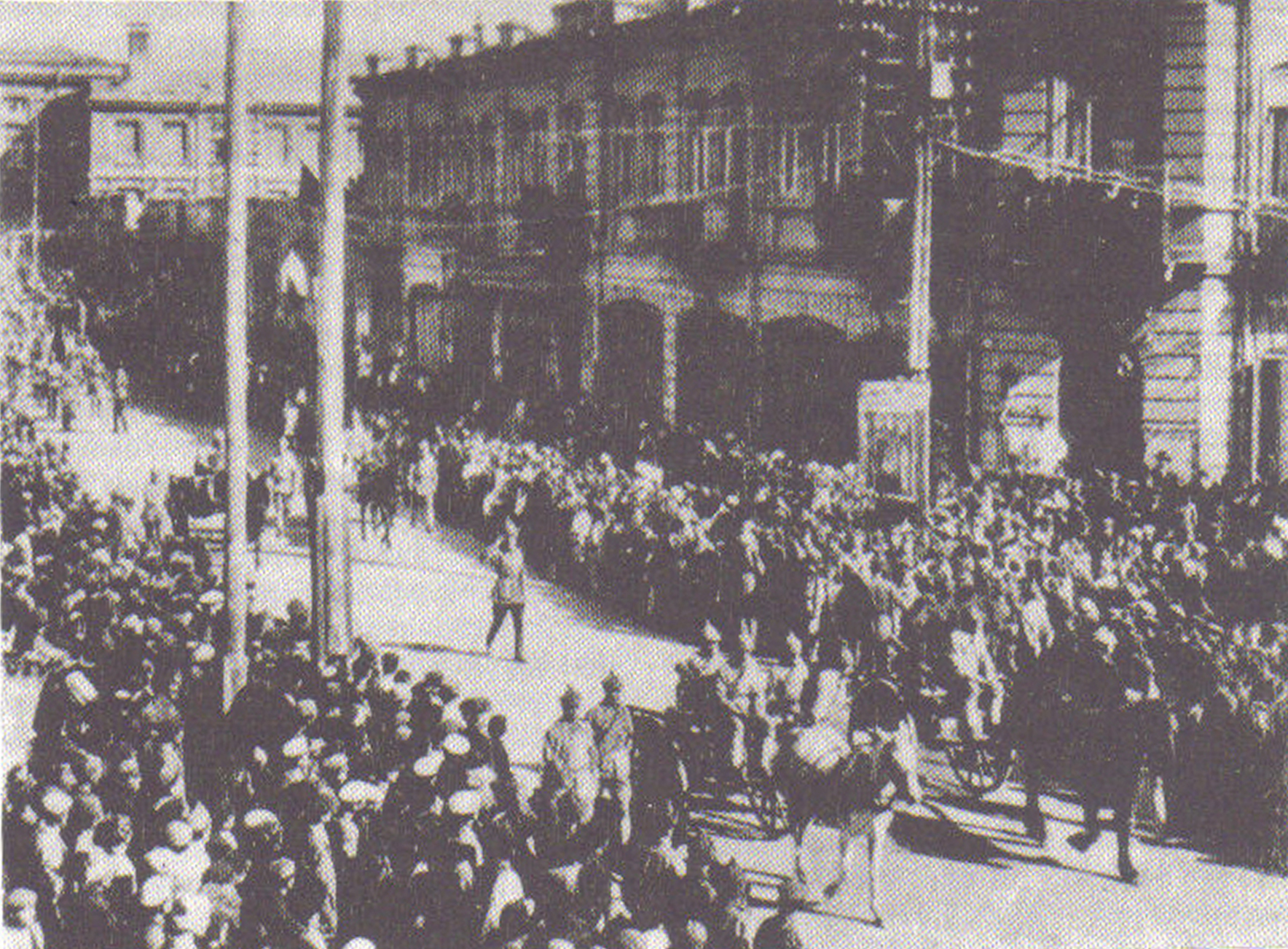
The Soviet 11th Red Army entered Yerevan in 1920, effectively ending Armenian self-rule.

Armenia gave way to communist power in late 1920. The Soviet 11th Red Army's invasion of the First Republic of Armenia started on the 29 November 1920. The actual transfer of power took place on 2 December in Yerevan, when the Armenian leadership approved an ultimatum presented to it by the Soviet plenipotentiary Boris Legran. Armenia agreed to join the Soviet sphere, while Soviet Russia agreed to protect its remaining territory from the advancing Turkish army. The Soviets also pledged to take steps to rebuild the army, to protect the Armenians and not to persecute non-communists, although the final condition of this pledge was reneged when the Dashnaks were forced out of the country. The Soviet Government proposed the annexation of the Nagorno-Karabakh and Syunik regions of Armenia to Soviet Azerbaijan. This step was strongly rejected by Garegin Nzhdeh, who declared Syunik as a self-governing region on 25 December 1920. In January 1921, Drastamat Kanayan sent a telegram to Nzhdeh, suggesting allowing the sovietisation of Syunik, through which they could gain the support of the Bolshevik government in solving the problems of the Armenian lands. Nzhdeh did not depart from Syunik and continued his struggle against the Red Army and Soviet Azerbaijan.

== Declaration ==
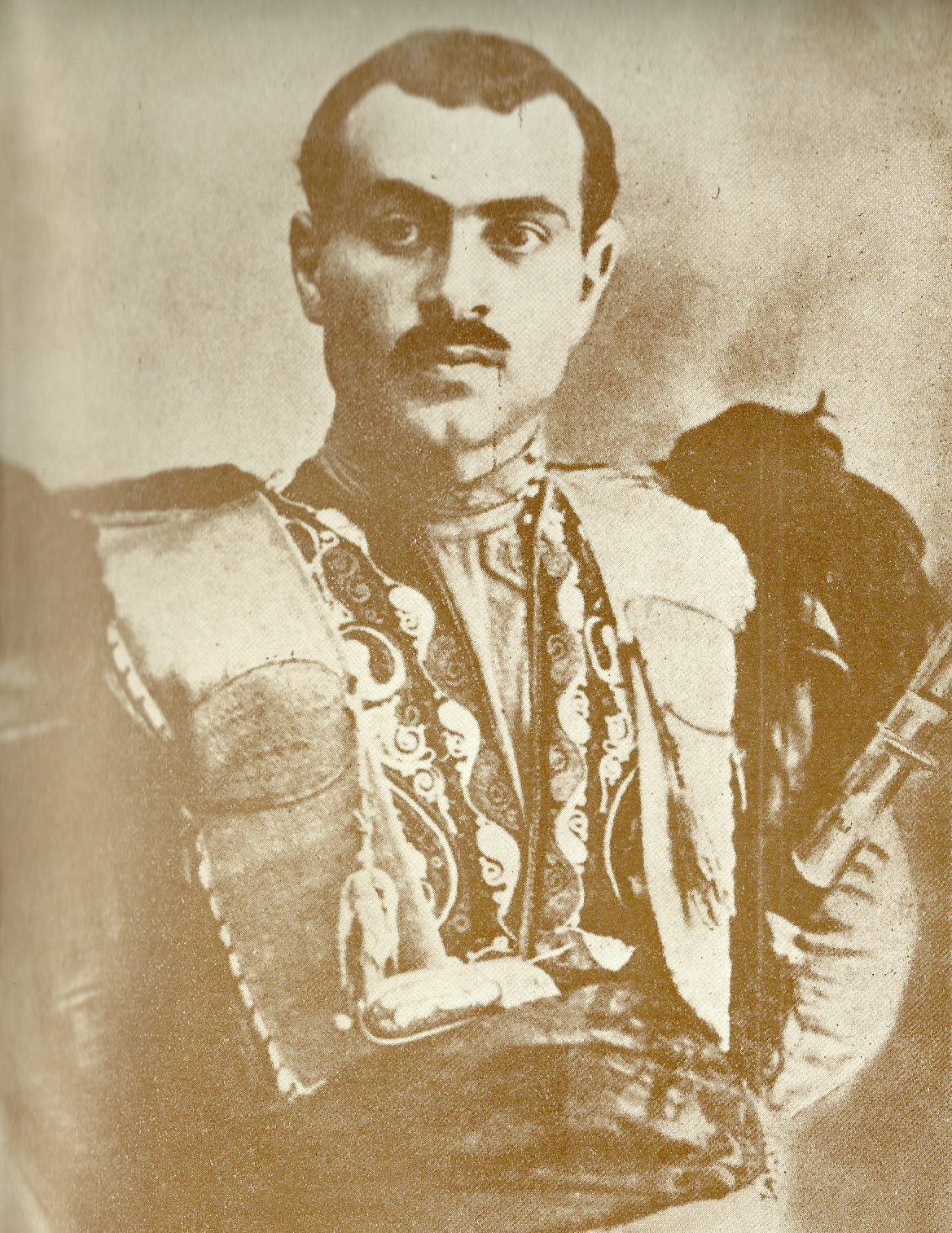
Garegin Nzhdeh was the leader of anti-Bolshevik resistance.

On 18 February 1921, the ARF led an anti-Soviet rebellion in Yerevan and seized power. The ARF controlled Yerevan and the surrounding regions for almost 42 days before being defeated by the numerically superior Red Army troops later in April 1921. The leaders of the rebellion then retreated into the Syunik region.

On 26 April 1921, the 2nd Pan-Zangezurian congress, held in Tatev monastery, announced the independence of the self-governing regions of Daralakyaz (Vayots Dzor), Zangezur, and Mountainous Artsakh, under the name of the Republic of Mountainous Armenia and later on 1 June 1921, it was renamed the Republic of Armenia.

== See also ==
- History of Nagorno-Karabakh
- List of historical unrecognized states and dependencies
