= Armenia Avenue =

Street in Tampa, Florida

Armenia Avenue in Tampa, Florida is home to many Latin American restaurants including numerous Cuban cuisine restaurants and bakeries. It was known as Armina Avenue originally and was once lined with cigar factories, including the Armina Cigar Factory. It was part of the then independent city of West Tampa. Several historic buildings are located on the street. A. Sanataella Cigar Factory established a factory on Armenia a in 1908. It was closed in 1989. The Arenas Building is a brick structure from 1932. Garcia and Vega Company opened a factory in 1907. The site may have been occupied earlier by the Bonded Havana Cigar Company. It also was used by the Oliva Tobacco Company

== See also ==
- List of places named after Armenia
