= Armenia, Antioquia =

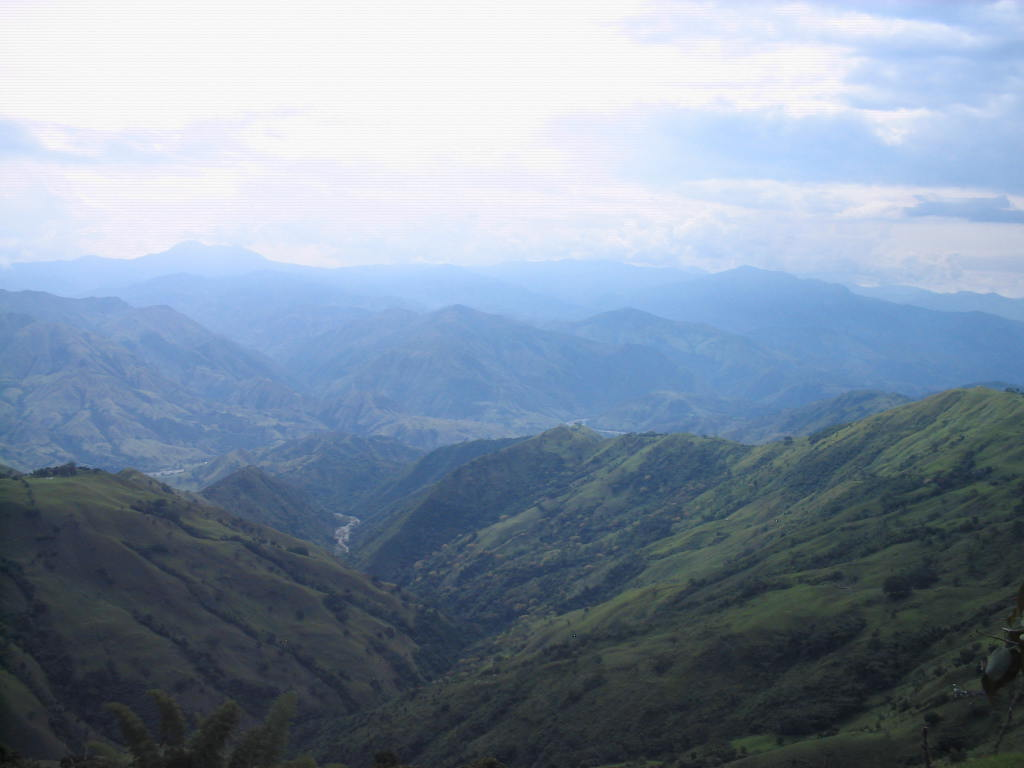

- Flag
- Nickname: Municipality
- Location of Armenia within Antioquia Department

- Location in Colombia
- Coordinates: 6°9′23″N 75°47′14″W
- Country: Colombia
- Departamento: Antioquia Department
- Subregion: Western
- Founded: 1864

Government
  - Mayor: José Ignacio Cuartas Quiroz

Area
  - Total: 110 km^{2} (42 sq mi)
- Elevation: 1,800 m (5,900 ft)

Population (2002)
  - Total: 7,006
  - Density: 63.7/km^{2} (165/sq mi)
- Time zone: UTC-5 (Colombia Standard Time)

Armenia, also known as Armenia Mantequilla (Spanish for Butter Armenia) to avoid confusion with other Armenias, is a municipality and town in the western region of the Antioquia Department, Colombia. It lies at an altitude of 1,800 m (5,900 ft) above sea level.
