= La Armenia =

Neighborhood of Quito, Ecuador

Coordinates: -0°17′23″N 78°27′48″W

Armenia is a neighborhood located in Quito in the Pichincha Province, Ecuador.
