= Armenia Bonito, Atlántida =

Coordinates: 15°43′42″N 86°51′36″W

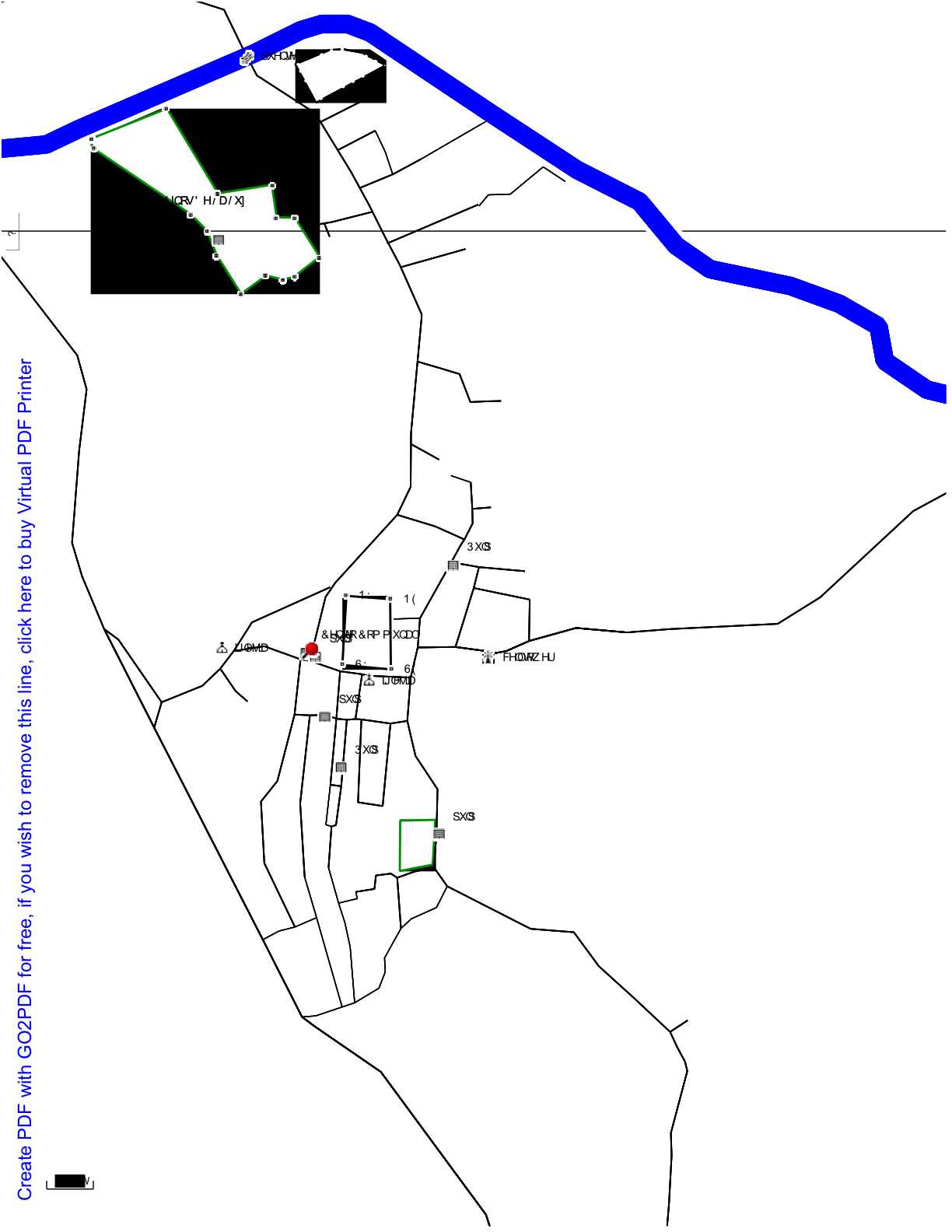
A map of Armenia Bonito

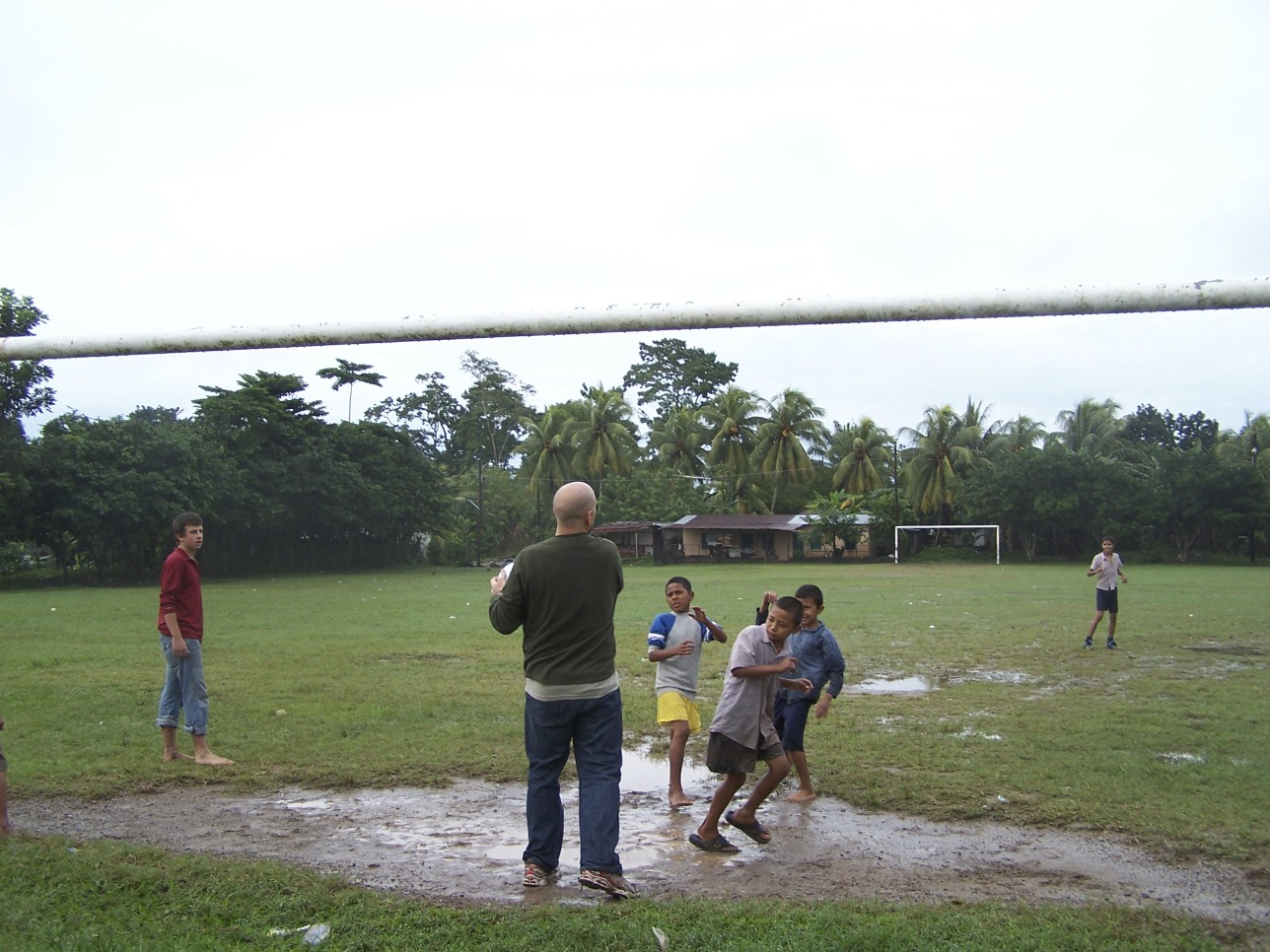
A Soccer field in Armenia Bonito

Armenia Bonito - A "barrio" or "colonia" 11 kilometres (7 mi) west of downtown La Ceiba in the Atlántida Department in the country of Honduras in Central America. It is located in the northern part of Honduras within view of Caribbean Sea.

== Geography ==
Population: +/- 3,000

It is sometimes called Armenia Nueva or simply Armenia. The communities of Primer de Mayo and Rodas are in the same vicinity.

At the center of the community is an adult soccer field that is located at 15 43’ 42”N x 86 51’ 36” W and sits 22 meters above sea level. Its climate is tropical. The roads are dirt covered with river rock. It is located inside Pico Bonito National Park (PBNP). Golosón International Airport (LCE) is less than 1.6 km (1 mi) from Armenio Bonito.

Armenia Bonito is bordered on the west by the Rio Bonito (beautiful river) and on the south by the mountain range called Nombre de Dios (name of God).

== Demographics ==
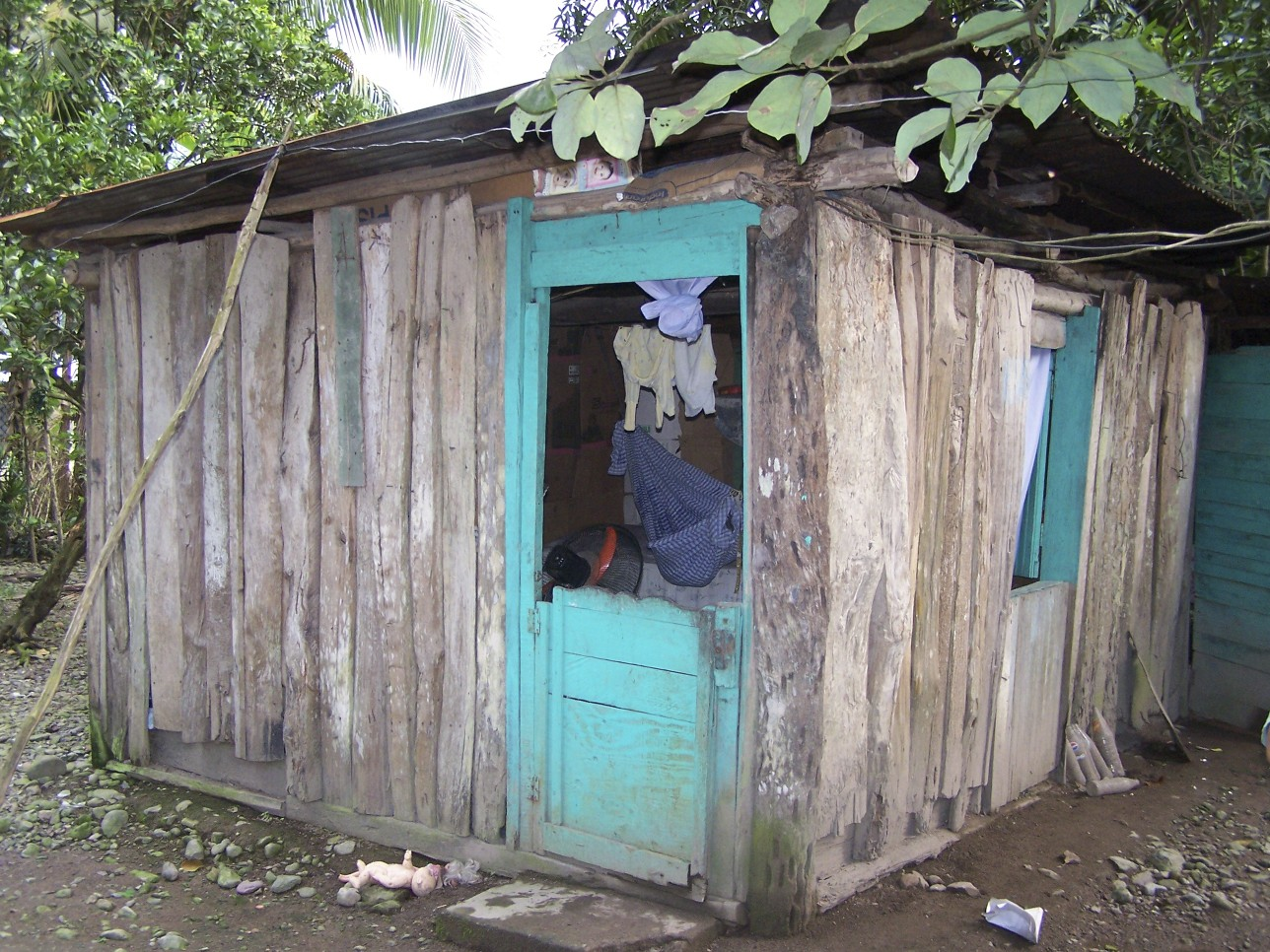
A home in Armenia Bonito

Armenia Bonito is a small village of approximately 3,000 people and there are 300 houses. The average person in this community makes less than $3,500US/year. The average home is made of cinder block and has an outdoor toilet, tin roof, limited electricity and poor drinking water. Other homes in the community are made of sticks and mud with thatched roofs. While most homes have a cement foundation some homes have dirt floors.

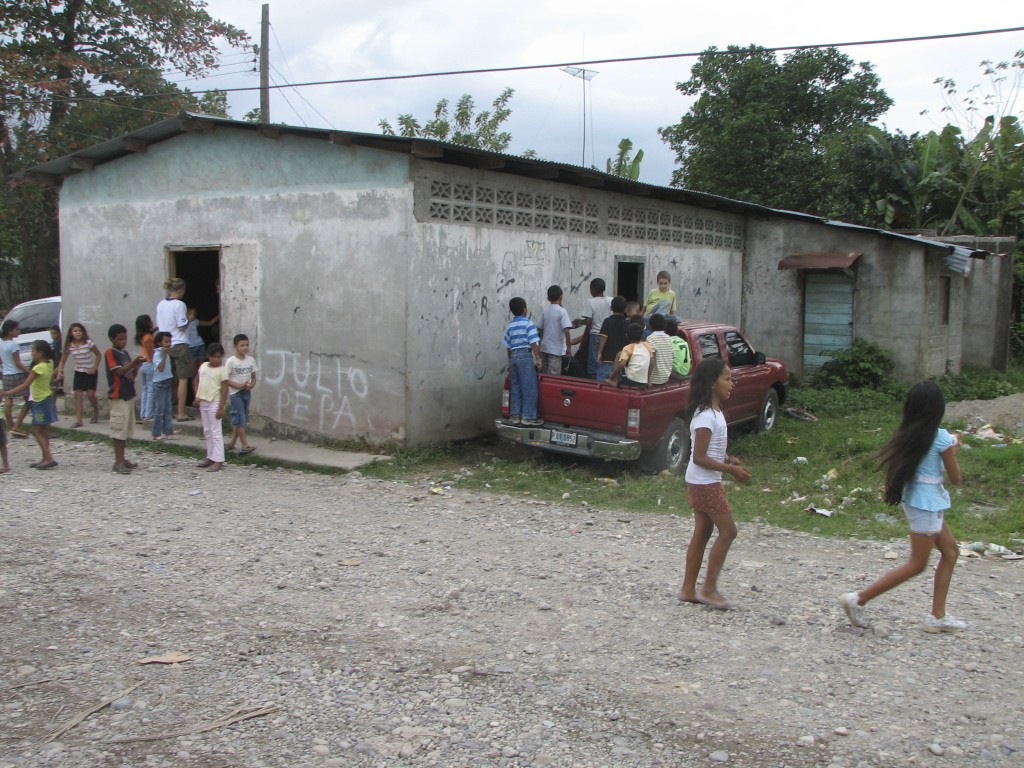
The town hall in Armenia Bonito

In Armenia Bonito there are two elementary schools and kinder school. There is a boy's orphanage, a soccer field, four small Christian churches, one Catholic church, a two-room town hall and approximately 10 small stores run out of homes.

The "Tree of Life" medical clinic opened on February 21, 2013 and is open four days a week. The clinic is run by the Presbyterian Church in Honduras.

The "Presbyterian Education Center of La Ceiba" is the only high school in Armenia Bonito. It opened on February 10, 2014 and provides a Christian based high school education.

== See also ==
- La Ceiba
- Honduras
