= Armenian =

Armenian may refer to:

- Something of, from, or related to Armenia, a country in the South Caucasus region of Eurasia
- Armenians, the national people of Armenia, or people of Armenian descent
  - Armenian diaspora, Armenian communities around the world
- Armenian language, the Indo-European language spoken by the Armenian people
  - Armenian alphabet, the alphabetic script used to write Armenian
  - Armenian (Unicode block)

== People ==
- Armenyan, also spelled Armenian in the Western Armenian language, an Armenian surname
  - Haroutune Armenian (born 1942), Lebanon-born Armenian-American academic, physician, doctor of public health (1974), Professor, President of the American University of Armenia
  - Gohar Armenyan (born 1995), Armenian footballer
  - Raffi Armenian (born 1942), Armenian-Canadian conductor, pianist, composer, and teacher

== Others ==
- SS Armenian, a ship torpedoed in 1915

== See also ==
- Armenia (disambiguation)
- Lists of Armenians
