= Buddhism in Armenia =

Buddhism (Note: Eastern Armenian: բուդդայականություն, buddayakanut‘yun, or բուդդիզմ, buddizm; Western Armenian: պուտտայականութիւն or պուտտիզմ) is a minor religion in Armenia, with a small but unknown number of adherents. The first direct contacts of Armenians with Buddhism occurred in the 13th century during the height of the Mongol Empire, culminating in the foundation of a Buddhist monastery in Armenia by the Buddhist emperor Hulegu Khan of the Ilkhanate after his conquest of Armenia when Buddhism was declared as an official religion. Contacts recurred elsewhere in subsequent centuries through Armenian merchants. In the 19th and early 20th centuries, Armenian intellectuals developed a strong interest in the religion.

== Early indirect contacts ==
Some scholars have identified An Shigao, China's earliest Buddhist translator, as the second-century Parthian prince Parthamasiris, who was appointed client king of Armenia by Roman Emperor Trajan in 113 AD. This identification, however, has been widely disputed by scholars. (Note: Martha Cheung noted that it is "not the consensus of Buddhist scholars," while Eva Hung wrote that the identification "has now been rejected by most scholars of Chinese Buddhism.")

An early indirect link of Armenia with Buddhism is the medieval Christian legend of Barlaam and Josaphat (Հովասափ եւ Բարաղամ, Yovasap‘ ew Barałam), which is inspired by the life of Buddha. There are three Armenian recensions of the legend, including a verse version by Arakel Baghishetsi (Arakel of Bitlis) composed in 1434. James R. Russell suggests that the Middle Armenian folk ballad of prince Aslan, recorded in modern times, assimilated aspects of the life of the Buddha, transmitted through the Christianized tale of Barlaam and Josaphat.

== 13th century contacts ==
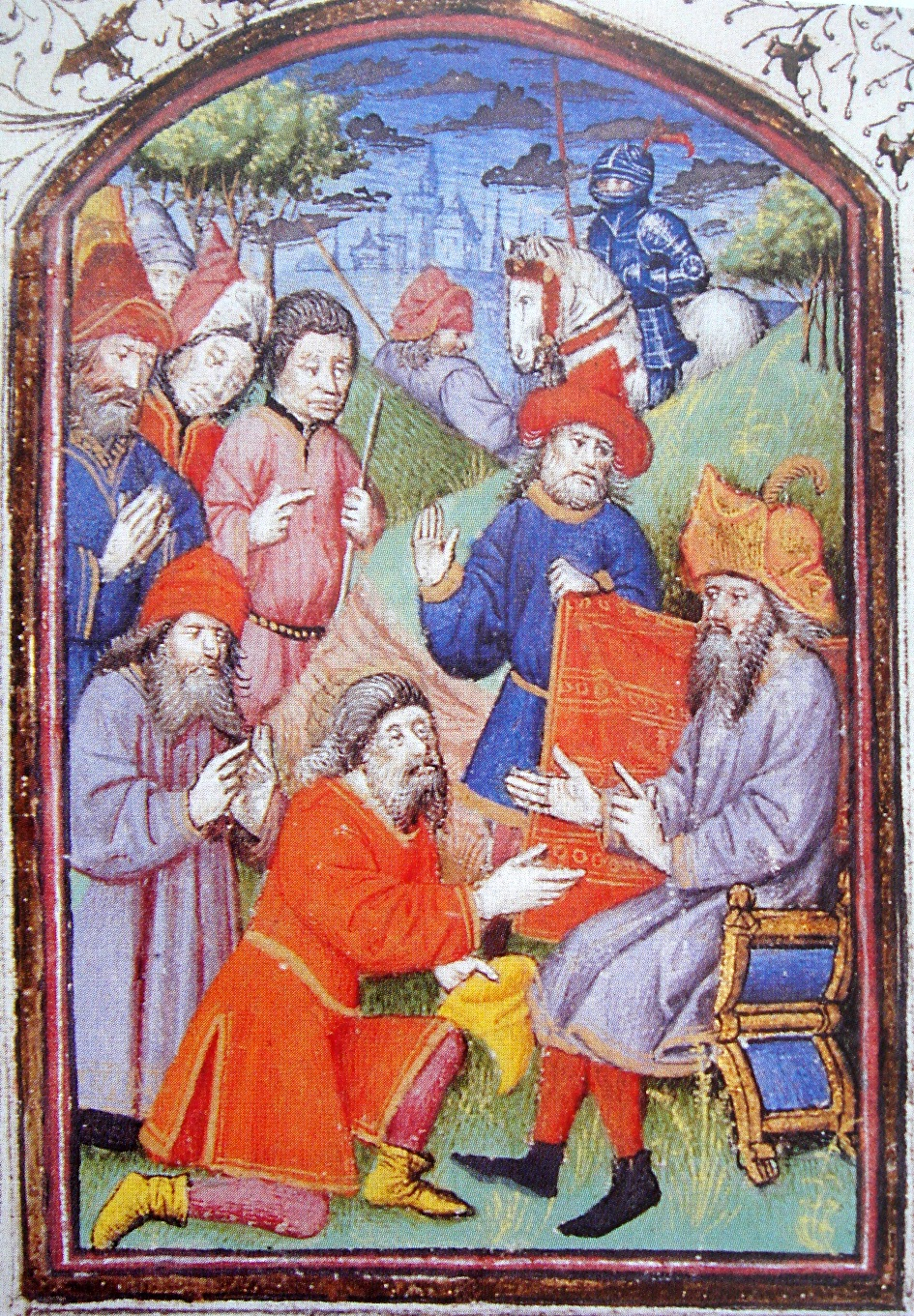
Hethum I (seated) in the Mongol court of Karakorum, "receiving the homage of the Mongols". Miniature from Histoire des Tartars, Hayton of Corycus (1307).

In the context of the 13th century Armenian-Mongol alliance, King Hethum I of Armenian Cilicia travelled to the court of Möngke Khan in Karakorum in 1254–55, which was chronicled by Kirakos Gandzaketsi. It contains accounts about Buddhism. Philip C. Almond identified Hethum and Marco Polo as the only two medieval travelers to Asia who transmitted information about the Buddha. John Andrew Boyle noted that Kirakos offered fewer details about Buddhism than his contemporary William of Rubruck, but he "anticipates Polo in supplying the names" of the historical and the future Buddha, Śākyamuni and Maitreya.

Kirakos described Buddhists as "idol-worshippers" who worship the clay images of Šakmonia and Madri. (Note: Grupper argued that the Armenian form Šakmonia corresponds "fairly well to the old Turkic forms Sakimuni and Sakyamuni" of Śākyamuni. As for Madri, he argued it is not a loan word from Chinese or Tibetan, and instead can best be explained as going back to the Uyghur name Maitri, rather than directly from the Sanskrit Maitreya.) He wrote: "An entire people, women and children included, are priests. They are called toyink‘, (Note: Toyin refers to Buddhist priests. Grupper noted that it is a "Turkic ecclesiastical title reserved for monks of noble descent.") and have their heads and beards shaven. They wear cloaks like Christian [priests] but [fastened] at the breast, not at the shoulder. They are moderate in eating and marriage."

Both Kirakos and Vardan Areveltsi wrote on Hulegu Khan's trust of Buddhist clergy, explaining it with the latter's promise of his immortality. Kirakos called Buddhist priests "sorcerers and witches". He added: "They deceived [Hülegü] and said that they would make him immortal; and he lived, moved, and mounted [his horse] according to their words and thoroughly gave himself over to their will. Many times during the day he bowed to the ground to their leader, and ate from the dedicatory altar in the house of idols and esteemed it more than any of them. Therefore he especially adorned their temple of idols." Vardan wrote that Hülegü was "deceived by the astrologers and priests of some images called Šakmonia".

=== Buddhist monastery in Armenia ===
Contemporary Armenian and Arab sources attest that Hulegu Khan (Hülegü), grandson of Genghis Khan and founder of the Ilkhanate in Persia (Iran), built a highland Buddhist monastery in his summer pastures in the mountains of Armenia. (Note: He also built Buddhist temples in Khoy and Maragheh in modern-day Iran.) Rashīd al-Dīn provided its name, Labnasagut, which may mean "Dwellings of the Lamas." (Note: Grupper wrote that the meaning corresponds to the Sanskrit term vihāra. He suggested that it is composed of the Tibeto-Mongol compound plural form lab-nar "lamas" and the unattested deverbal noun sayuyud, from the Written Mongol verbal root sayu- "to live, dwell, reside.") It was in Armenia's Ala-taγ (Aladağ) mountains, north of Lake Van, in a region known as the plain of Daṙn in Armenian. (Note: Henry George Raverty localized Labnasagut as being a "few miles west of Bayazid," near the northern shore of Lake Van, close to the eastern branch of the Euphrates." Tadevos Hakobyan et al. placed Darndasht (Դառնդաշտ)/Aladagh (Ալադաղ) west of Maku, Iran, in the Artaz gavaṙ (canton) of Vaspurakan. Grupper placed the site in the Ala-taγ massif, northeast of Lake Van, in the Darn steppe.) Land for the monastery was granted in 1259 and it was built between 1261 and 1265 and presumably operated for three decades, until 1295, when Ilkhan Ghazan converted to Islam, (Note: Hülegü's descendants travelled to the summer pastures at Ala-taγ as late as 1301.) and most likely ordered its destruction. The site has not been discovered by archaeologists. The monastery likely contained at least ten clerics (initially likely from Uighur communities), had two monumental sculptures of Śākyamuni and Maitreya, and "functioned as an active center of Buddhism." Grupper described Labnasagut as the "forward-most outpost of Buddhism in late medieval Western Asia" and the "cradle of II-Qanid Buddhism."

== Later contacts ==
=== Buddhist elements in Armenian art ===
Dickran Kouymjian located Buddhist elements in the 1286 manuscript of The Lectionary of Prince Het‘um, commissioned by later king Hethum II. The grey-brown Chinese-inspired lions, protecting the Christ from dragons, trace their origin to Buddhism and the Buddha was considered a lion among men. There is also a Buddhist Wheel of the Law. In another instance, there is a pair of eight pointed rosettes representing the same wheel.

In the Gospels of 1587, Hakob Jughayetsi portraited God, Christ, and the Virgin Mary in a style Vrej Nersessian wrote "could easily be taken for an image of Buddha, and the similarity cannot be accidental." He, like Sirarpie Der Nersessian, suggests that Hakob drew inspiration from objects bearing an image of Buddha brought by Julfa merchants from Asia. Christina Maranci wrote that given his "mercantile family background, such contact is certainly possible." He portrayed God as a "pale-eyed, jowled man with a down-turned mouth." Christ is portrayed in one image with chubby face and encircled by a double nimbus in the image of Buddha and in another seated cross-legged like Buddha. Nersessian noted that the portraits, seemingly "almost 'barbarous'," deviate from established traditions and were unprecedented and never imitated in Armenian illuminated manuscripts.

=== Tibetan bell of Etchmiadzin ===
Another evidence of Armenian contacts with Buddhism is the Tibetan inscription on the bell of Etchmiadzin Cathedral, Armenia's mother church. The bell was housed at its 17th century bell tower, and was widely reported by foreign travelers and scholars throughout the 19th century. The bell was removed in the late 1930s by the Soviets and has disappeared without a trace. The inscription survives as a copy in an 1890 book by Ghevont Alishan:

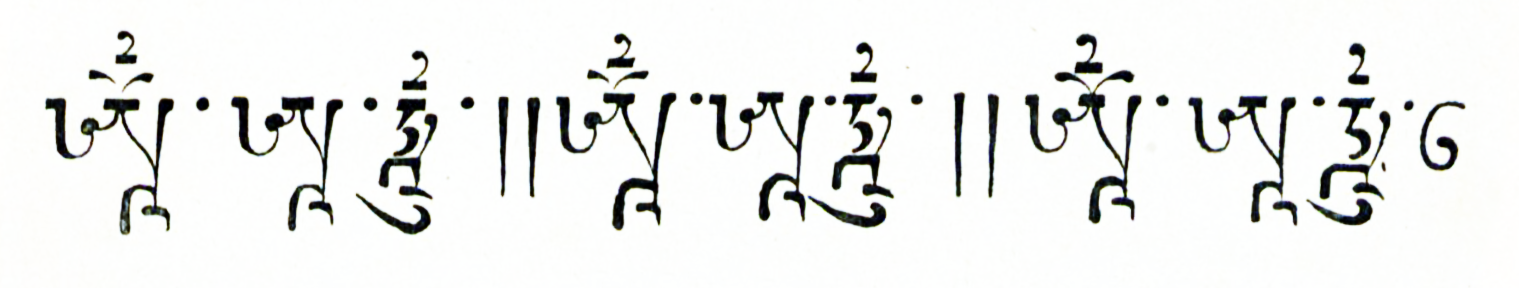

Dan Martin, a scholar of Tibet, wrote that the three-syllable mantra oṃ aḥ hūṃ, repeated thrice on the bell, is ubiquitous in Secret Mantra Buddhism and is used for blessing offerings. He argued that the inscription suggests that the bell was a consecrated Buddhist object. Hewsen suggested that the bell was "probably the long-forgotten gift of some Mongol or Ilkhanid khan." Martin proposed an alternative theory; suggesting that the bell may have originally been housed at the Labnasagut monastery or another Buddhist temple in the region and was later salvaged and transferred to Etchmiadzin or may have been brought from Lhasa to Armenia by New Julfa merchants in the 17th century, around the time the bell tower was built.

== Modern ==
=== Intellectual interest ===
There was significant interest in Buddhism in Armenian intellectual circles in the 19th and early 20th centuries, among both Russian Armenians and Turkish Armenians. Ghazaros Aghayan spoke highly of Edwin Arnold's The Light of Asia and began translating it from Russian in 1894, though he left the work incomplete and unpublished. In 1895, during his time at Leipzig University, Hakob Manandian authored a brief article on Buddhism and Brahmanism and their influence on 19th century European philosophy. It was first published in 1990. Avetik Isahakyan wrote that he had been obsessed with Buddha (and had been at times been a Tolstoyan, Nietzschean, a social democrat, anarchist) in his quest to liberate humanity from suffering. Hovhannes Tumanyan, according to some scholars, was influenced by Buddhism and other Eastern religions. Tumanyan wrote c. 1918 that the East has brought man to god and the universe and stirred Ātman (the self). Nar-Dos found Buddhism sensible and introspective, but argued that with its asceticism, it exhausts man to the point of self-destruction.

In the Ottoman Empire, Khosrov Keshishian authored a critical study on Buddhism in 1900, and Meroujan Barsamian wrote a poem titled "Buddha's Tears" in 1907. A Western Armenian translation of Paul Carus's The Gospel of Buddha was published in Constantinople in 1911. Diran Chrakian (Intra) was influenced by Buddhist ideas.

Yeghishe Charents took a keen interest in Asian cultures, especially Buddhism, was fascinated with the Buddha, and collected Buddha statuettes. In 1933 Martiros Saryan drew Charents and his family with a Buddha statuette. In 1936 Charents asked Alexander Bazhbeuk-Melikyan to draw him in a Buddhist style, seated in lotus position. Inspired by Gandhi, Charents signed it "Mahatma Charents".

According to some scholars, George Gurdjieff's Fourth Way was influenced, among other sources, by Buddhism, particularly Tibetan Buddhism.

=== Soviet and independent Armenia ===
The practice of Yoga in Armenia began as early as the 1970s and was tolerated by the Soviet authorities.

Among Armenians, conversions to non-Christian religions remain uncommon, but Alexander Agadjanian has noted that certain individuals "may choose to convert to Buddhism, the Baháʼí Faith or any blend of the New Age." According to Yulia Antonyan, in post-Soviet Armenia some people returned to religion seeking spirituality, but "only a small number of people have chosen Eastern religions and practices or their westernized or russianized versions." She noted that "their interest in eastern religions and religious philosophies and practices has been ultimately transformed into a sort of mystic pragmatism aimed at reaching physical or spiritual well-being through doctrines and practices of Buddhism and Hinduism such as meditation, Yoga or Ayurveda." The majority of these people, however, continue to identify as "Armenian-Christian" in terms of ethnic and cultural identity.

In 2006 Armenpress reported on the existence of Buddhists in Armenia. In 2010, Armenia's statistics agency listed Buddhism as one of the options for religion during a pilot census, but the numbers of followers of minor religions was not published for the 2011 census. Armenia has no Buddhist places of worship. In 2012 the Yerevan Municipality tentatively proposed the construction of a tourist attraction near Dalma Garden Mall that would include a church, a mosque, a synagogue, and a Buddhist temple. (Note: Mkrtich Minasyan, head of Armenia's Union of Architects, criticized the idea, arguing that these religious buildings was not justified. One media outlet mocked the idea of a Buddhist temple in Armenia.)

The World Peace Initiative Foundation organized meditation workshops in Armenia in 2015 and 2017.

== Armenian diaspora ==
In Myanmar (Burma), where an Armenian mercantile community was active in the 17th–19th centuries, some Armenians and their descendants (including those of partial Armenian ancestry) converted to Buddhism. Before the British rule, non-Buddhist foreigners, including Armenians, "did not attempt to convert Buddhists, with the exception of their own spouses." Ba Maw, Premier of British Burma in 1937–39 and dictator of the State of Burma in 1943–45, was reportedly (Note: Min wrote that it was a rumor, "strengthened by the fact that one Thaddeus, an Armenian, occasionally visited the two boys in school on behalf of the mother" and that he had a "complexion much fairer than that of most of the Anglo-Burman boys" at his school. "It seems, however, that both their parents were of pure Talaing [Mon] blood.") of partial Armenian descent. He was brought up as a Christian and later converted to Buddhism to win the favor of Burmese Buddhists.

In 1830, an Armenian archaeologist discovered a Pali papyrus of a Buddhist ritual in a temple and transferred it from Madras (Chennai), India to San Lazzaro degli Armeni, an Armenian monastery in Venice, where it is now displayed.

In the late 19th century, the Calcutta Armenians gifted a silver model of the famous Buddhist temple at Bodh Gaya to honor the Russian Heir Tsesarevich Nicholas II, arranged by Joseph David Beglar, an archaeologist-amateur with authority among the Armenian community.

Lebanese-born Armenian painter Seta Manoukian has converted to Buddhism and is an ordained nun.

== Official religious contacts ==
During his first visit to the U.S. in 1979, the Dalai Lama met in New York, among other religious leaders, with Archbishop Torkom Manoogian, primate of the Eastern Diocese of the Armenian Church in America.

During his 1997 visit to Thailand, Catholicos Karekin I met with local Buddhist leaders.

== See also ==
- Hinduism in Armenia
- Lom people
