= Bedros Tourian =

Ottoman Armenian poet (1851–1872)

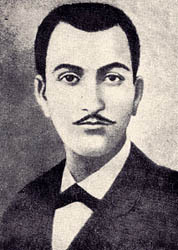
- A posthumous drawing of Tourian by M. Barsamian and D. Chakrian (1893) based on the features of his family members and the recollections of his family and friends
- Born: 1 June 1851; Üsküdar, Ottoman Empire
- Died: 2 February 1872 (aged 20); Constantinople, Ottoman Empire
- Occupations: Writer, poet, playwright, actor

Bedros Tourian (also spelled Petros Duryan, Turian, Armenian: Պետրոս Դուրեան; (Note: Reformed orthography: Պետրոս Դուրյան, Petros Duryan) 1 June [O.S. 20 May] 1851 – 2 February [O.S. 21 January] 1872) was an Armenian poet, playwright and actor. His career was cut short when he died of tuberculosis at the age of twenty, but he gained lasting renown for his highly personal and innovative lyric poetry.

Tourian was born into a poor family in Scutari near Constantinople. He showed interest in theater and began translating plays from French to Armenian while still in school. He wrote his first known poem at the age of thirteen and his first play at fifteen. Despite the urging of his relatives to abandon art and writing for more gainful employment, he continued to write poetry and compose and perform in plays. He became famous in his lifetime as a playwright (while earning little money from his plays), although since his death his poetry has come to be valued more highly than his plays. He fell ill from tuberculosis in 1871 and died the next year.

Tourian wrote poems on themes of patriotism, unrequited love, premature death, nature, and sentiments of loneliness and hopelessness. His poems have been praised for their freedom from convention, their spontaneity, and for bringing the individual's deep emotions and psychology back into Armenian poetry. He has been called the "first great love poet of modern Armenian lyric poetry", and some of his poems have been rated by one critic as among the best ever written in Armenian. Most of his plays are historical tragedies with patriotic themes, although he experimented with the genre of social drama in his last play.

== Biography ==
=== Early life and education ===
Bedros Tourian, born Zmbayan (Armenian: Զըմպայեան), was born on 1 June [O.S. 20 May] 1851 in Scutari (Üsküdar), on the Asian side of the Bosporus, across from Istanbul. His father, Abraham, was a poor blacksmith with a large family. He had two sisters, Elbis and Ardem, both of whom died at a young age, and three brothers: Harutiun, who died a year after him, Agrippas, and Mehran, who was also a writer and later took the name Yeghishe and became the Armenian Patriarch of Jerusalem. Despite his family's difficult financial situation, he was able to begin his education from an early age, starting his formal schooling at the age of six. He attended the Armenian academy (jemaran) in Scutari, where he was taught by the satirist Hagop Baronian and the playwright Srabion Tghlian. At the academy, he was taught Classical Armenian (still used as a literary language by Armenians at the time), the Bible, the works of old Armenian historians, arithmetic, Turkish, French, music, and painting, among other subjects. At first, he was a sickly child and did not excel especially in school, but he performed excellently on his end-of-the-year exams in 1865, receiving a volume of Alphonse de Lamartine's poetry as a reward; Lamartine's work greatly influenced Tourian.

Tourian read widely in Armenian and French. He read the works of foreign authors such as Lord Byron, William Shakespeare, Goethe, and Friedrich Schiller. He took interest in theater and read the romantic dramas of Victor Hugo and Alexandre Dumas. At this time, the Armenian theater of Istanbul was flourishing. Tourian attended plays secretly, against the wishes of his father, who considered it a waste of time and sometimes beat his son for going to the theater. However, Tourian continued to attend the theater and later became a playwright and actor himself. He was encouraged by the theater director Hagop Vartovian (also known as Güllü Agop), who brought French plays to be translated into Armenian by students of the Armenian academy. Tourian translated eight plays from French for Vartovian in his last year at school. None of these translations have survived, although it is known that one of them was of Hugo's Le roi s'amuse. He also translated Shakespeare's Macbeth into Armenian; this translation, too, is considered lost. Tourian wrote his first poem at the age of thirteen (Note: One untitled poem by Tourian written in 1864 has survived; see Tourian 1971, pp. 11–12/Tourian 2005, p. 49 for the poem.) and his first play, a partly sung pastoral melodrama titled Vart yev Shushan gam hovivk Masyats (Rose and Lily or the shepherds of Ararat, 1867), at fifteen. This first play, which depicts an intensely emotional story of love and hate, has been described as "lacking artistic merit." In 1867, finding his original surname unsuitable for a poet, he adopted the surname Tourian, formed by translating the Turkish word zımba (meaning "chisel") in his birth name to its Armenian equivalent tur/dur.

=== Literary and theatrical career ===
Tourian's talent for poetry was met with indifference by his family and teachers. Before graduating from school, he was briefly sent by his family to become a pharmacist's student, but he remained in this role for only two days before returning to the academy to continue his education. Tourian graduated from the academy in 1867. He worked for free as an Armenian language teacher in 1868, then began working as a secretary for an Armenian merchant. However, his main interest remained the theater and literature. He performed poorly at work, writing poems on business documents. He left his job as a secretary after nine months. Against the wishes of his parents and relatives, he continued his activities in the world of theater, translating plays and writing his own, some of which were performed and brought him fame but only negligible remuneration. He also became an assistant of the editor of the Armenian newspaper Orakir dziln Avarayrvo (Sprout of Avarayr daily), where he published some articles and poems under his real name or a pen name for small sums of money. Eventually, he was forced to leave this position as well for financial reasons. The highly sensitive Tourian was deeply affected by the hardships of poverty, mockery by relatives and others, and rejection by women. He was constantly urged by his relatives to leave behind art and writing. The bishop and author Khoren Kalfayan (Narbey Lusinian), who valued Tourian's literary talent and promised to print his works, helped him find a job as a private Armenian tutor, but he soon left this job after his employer cut his salary.

After this, Tourian joined Hagop Vartovian's Osmanlı Tiyatrosu (Ottoman theater) as an actor. He wrote a historical tragedy titled Ardashes Ashkharhagal (Artashes the Conqueror), which was first performed in 1870. The premiere attracted more than a thousand people, an unprecedented number for the time. After the success of this play, he wrote several more: Angumn Arshagunyats harsdutyan (The fall of the Arshakuni dynasty, 1870), Asbadagutyunk Parsgats i Hays gam gordzanumn Ani mayrakaghakin Pakradunyats (Persian invasions of Armenia or the destruction of Ani, capital of the Bagratunis, staged in 1908), Gordzanumn Hrovma ishkhanutyan (The destruction of Roman rule, 1870), Shushanig, Dikran II (Tigranes II), and Tadron gam tshvarner (Theater or the wretched, 1878). All of these, save for the last one, are historical tragedies. Tadron gam tshvarner is a social drama about inequality in contemporary Armenian life, the protagonist of which is thought to be a self-insertion by Tourian. It has been called the first Western Armenian social drama. Tourian's most performed play is Sev hogher, another historical tragedy set during the fourteenth-century invasions of Timur. Several of Tourian's historical plays were performed with music composed by Tigran Chukhajian. Tourian also wrote a play titled Darakir i Siberia (Exiled in Siberia), an allegory about the exile of the Russian Armenian author Mikayel Nalbandian; this play was found after Tourian's death. Eventually, Tourian felt that he was being treated unjustly by Vartovian and left the theater.

=== Illness, death and aftermath ===
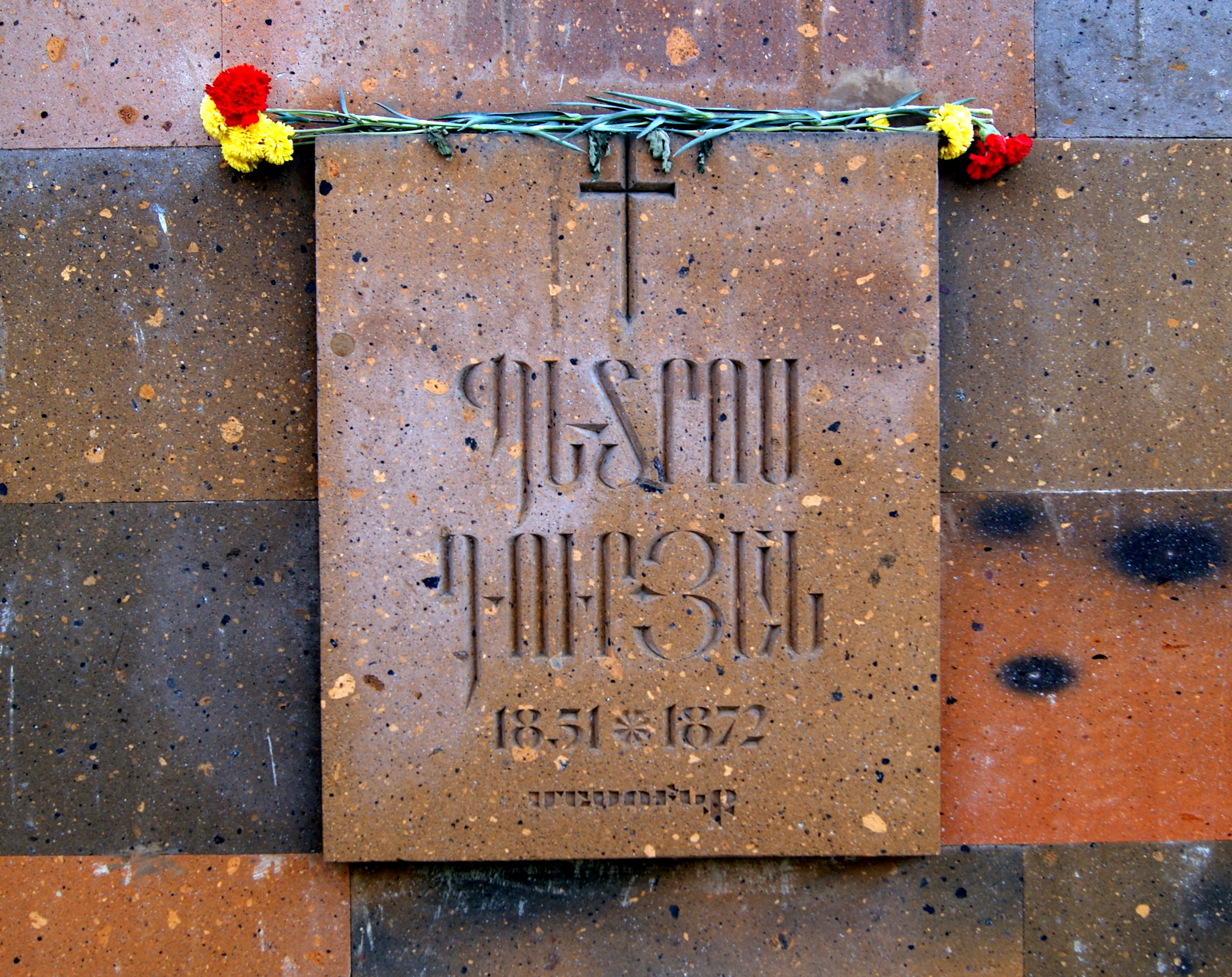
Tourian's grave at the Komitas Pantheon in Yerevan

The first symptoms of Tourian's tuberculosis appeared in January 1871. In May 1871, Tourian's close friend Vartan Lutfian died of tuberculosis. Tourian wrote an elegiac poem for his friend's funeral. (Note: "I kerezmann amenasirelvo Vartan Lutfiani" (At the grave of the most beloved Vartan Lutfian), see Tourian 1971, pp. 83–85.) After this, he fell into a state of physical weakness and depression, feeling that death was near. When he felt well enough, he wrote letters and poems. Tourian died on 2 February [O.S. 21 January] 1872. His funeral was held the next day and was attended by an unprecedented 4,000 people, accompanied by a choir and band. An artist declined to draw Tourian's face after his death, disfigured as it was by his illness. Another artist, Mgrdich Barsamian, began drawing Tourian's portrait on the basis of descriptions of people who knew him and the features of his family members, but Barsamian died before completing it. This portrait was finally completed by Diran Chrakian in 1893. Tourian was buried in the Armenian cemetery in Üsküdar. In 1957, when the Istanbul municipality was planning to build a road through the Üsküdar cemetery, the Armenian Patriarch of Constantinople Karekin Khachadourian had some of the graves, including Bedros Tourian's, removed to be later relocated to a different part of the cemetery. Fragments of Bedros Tourian's skull were disinterred and kept for more than ten years at the Patriarchate's headquarters. Karekin's successor Shenork Kaloustian brought Tourian's skull fragments to Soviet Armenia. These fragments were kept for many years at the Charents Museum of Literature and Arts in Yerevan and were used by anthropologist Andranik Chagharian to reconstruct Tourian's likeness. Tourian's skull fragments were interred in the Komitas Pantheon in Yerevan on 2 February 2011. As of 1993, his grave in Üsküdar was reportedly in good condition and had been moved only a few meters from its original site.

== Literary style, themes and evaluation ==
Tourian wrote his works in modern Western Armenian. Of the writings he produced in his short life, only 41 poems, fifteen letters, seven plays, nine articles and one eulogy by Tourian are known to have survived. (Note: Besides his lost translations from French, his lost works also include an unfinished autobiographical romantic novel titled Vosporean kisherner (Bosporus nights).) Tourian wrote poems on themes of patriotism, unrequited love, premature death, nature, and sentiments of loneliness and hopelessness. Most of his lyrical poems are written from the author's perspective and express his inner life. The themes of premature death and the injustice of life appear in Tourian's first known poem, which he wrote at the age of thirteen, long before he contracted tuberculosis. Two of his most popular works are "Ljag" (Little Lake), which alludes to his approaching death and complains of the indifference and inhumanity of the world, and "Trkuhin" (The Turkish Woman), which is about unrequited love. In one of his last poems, "Drdunchk" (Grievance), Tourian laments that he will be unable to fulfill his desire to enjoy life and rails against God. In a subsequent poem, he calmly asks for forgiveness. Tourian's patriotic poems were mainly written in the same period during which he was composing his historical tragedies (1867–1870). These poems mainly express concern about the current state of the Armenian people and its future. In one poem, he calls on Armenians to protest, while in another, he exhorts the Ottoman sultan to protect the Armenians or else give them the means to defend themselves. Most critics rate Tourian's political or patriotic poems below his more personal poems. Samvel Muradyan opines that Tourian's best patriotic poems are those which are lyrical in nature, stressing the emotional state of the patriotic individual moved by national tragedy.

Kevork Bardakjian writes that Tourian's poetry has some technical shortcomings but benefits from its freedom from the restrictions of convention, making it "innovative and splendidly spontaneous." Regarding Tourian's style, Bardakjian adds that "[b]eneath his predominantly elegiac and seemingly subdued style, there lurks a tempestuous soul, eagerly but vainly trying to cling to a life sadly cut short by consumption." He rates some of Tourian's poems as among the best ever written in Armenian. Albert Sharurian calls Tourian the "first great love poet of modern Armenian lyric poetry." He credits him with restoring the lost connection between modern Armenian poetry and medieval lyrical poetry and with bringing the individual's deep emotions and psychology into poetry. Arshag Chobanian writes, "I do not know in [Armenian] literature of a poet so personal, of a poetry arising directly from individual experience, as the poetry of Tourian; at the same time, so general, so infinite as to become the expression of the human Ego, besides being the poet's Ego. Here lies the greatest merit, the immortal value of this poet." Vahé Oshagan writes that "[t]oday [Tourian] has come to symbolize the prototype of the Armenian romantic poet—highly talented, very patriotic, poor and ungainly, unloved and unappreciated, fervently religious, and doomed to an untimely death․" Tourian is one of the most frequently published Armenian poets. His poetry has been translated into various foreign languages, including Russian, French, English, German and Italian.

Tourian's first play, Vart yev Shushan, was a pastoral melodrama, while in his last play Tadron gam tshvarner, he experimented with the genre of contemporary social drama. Most of Tourian's plays, however, are historical tragedies. These historical plays are set in periods of history in which Armenians were fighting against foreign invaders. His earlier plays display the influence of classicism, although he later abandoned classicist conventions and moved in the direction of romantic drama. Although Tourian was better known in his lifetime for his plays, they are regarded less highly than his poetry. Tourian's letters, written in his last years, have also been praised for their literary value.

== See also ==
- Mkrtich Beshiktashlian, an earlier Constantinopolitan Armenian Romantic poet
- Misak Metsarents, a later Armenian Romantic poet who also died at a young age of tuberculosis
