= Misak Metsarents =

Armenian poet

- Native name: Միսաք Մեծատուրյան
- Born: Misak Medzaturian; January 19, 1886 Agn, Harput Vilazet, Ottoman Empire
- Died: July 5, 1908 Istanbul
- Resting place: Church of St. George of Samatya
- Occupation: Poet, Prose writer, critic
- Notable works: Rainbow «Ծիածան» New Poems «Նոր տաղեր»

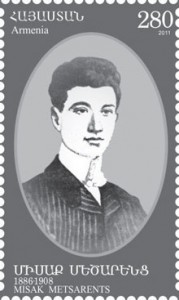

== Biography ==
Misak Metsarents was born Misak Metsaturian in January 1886 in the village of Pingyan/Benka, near Agn in the Harput Vilayet of the Ottoman Empire, to parents Iskuhi and Garabed. He was the youngest of four children (he had two brothers and a sister). His family belonged the most prominent clan of their village. According to one tradition, the Metsaturians were descended from one of the Armenian meliks (local rulers) of Karabakh; another tradition traces their origins to the medieval city of Ani. Pingyan was an almost entirely Armenian-populated village of about 1000 people; there, Armenians retained a degree of autonomy, and the men bore arms. As a child, Misak often explored the fields and woods around the village and liked folk songs and tales. Scholar James R. Russell connects the lively descriptions of nature and village life, as well as the "deep, indestructible cheerfulness", in Metsarents's poetry with the poet's early childhood experiences in Pingyan.

In 1895, after Pingyan was attacked by Muslims for the first time during the Hamidian massacres, Misak moved with his mother to live with his brother in Sivas, where he attended the Aramian School. In 1898, he enrolled in the Anatolia College in Merzifon, which was a boarding school run by American missionaries. There, he learned English and French, and he read the works of authors such as Oscar Wilde, Paul Verlaine, Bedros Tourian, Arshag Chobanian, Krikor Zohrab, Yeghia Demirjibashian, and possibly also Charles Baudelaire, Arthur Rimbaud, Edgar Allan Poe and William Blake. He is described as thin, melancholy, and somewhat shy. He first displayed symptoms of tuberculosis in 1901, after an incident in Sivas in which Metsarents was attacked by a group of Turkish boys who mistook him for one of his relatives, with whom they had fought earlier. They wounded Metsarents with a pocketknife, and a few days later he began to cough up blood. The attack also prompted Metsarents to write his first poem, "Marmni verk, srti verk" (Wounds of the body, wounds of the heart). In September 1902, he moved in with his father in Constantinople, where he attended the Getronagan Armenian High School and soon began to publish his works in Armenian journals. However, tuberculosis forced him to drop his studies in 1905. Metsarents died from the illness 5 July [O.S. 22 June] July 1908, at the age of 22.

== Poetry ==
Metsarents began writing in 1901, with his first verses published in 1903. He published in many Armenian periodicals, including Masis, Hanragitak, Arevelyan Mamul, Luys, Surhandak, Manzume-i Efkâr, and Biuzandion. He wrote more than 130 lyric poems during his lifetime, as well as about ten prose poems and short stories and a few articles of literary criticism. His poems quickly drew attention, including some criticism, to which Metsarents enthusiastically responded. He only managed to publish two volumes of poetry in his lifetime: Tsiatsan (Rainbow, 1907) and Nor tagher (New poems, 1907). He also kept a manuscript collection titled Babakhumner (Heartbeats), consisting of his poems from his student years. Metsarents translated and adapted some works by foreign writers, mostly English-language authors such as Rudyard Kipling, Oscar Wilde, Geoffrey Chaucer, Thomas Love Peacock, and Eugene Field.

Metsarents's poems have been praised for their language and use of imagery. Literary scholar Kevork Bardakjian writes that Metsarents "paid meticulous attention to form and wrote effortlessly, in a crystal clear, elegantly compact Western Armenian with fresh, vibrant imagery all his own." Armenian literary critic Edward Jrbashian connects Metsarents's poetry with the styles of classical Romanticism and Symbolism. (Earlier critics, who considered Symbolism a foreign and undesirable influence, had criticized Metsarents's work as excessively influenced by that style, while many defenders had denied any connection whatsoever between his poetry and Symbolism.) Some of his poems make use of connections between hue, sound, and sense. However, Metsarents did not adopt the Symbolists' individualistic and urban themes. Russell writes that Metsarents's poetry, while sharing some common elements with Symbolist poetry, "cherishes nature, celebrates life, and regards its Creator with grateful amazement", rather than identifying symbols of another, superior world as the Symbolists do. Jrbashian credits the poet with introducing new forms of poetic imagery into Western Armenian poetry, perfecting the short poem, and emphasizing the use of figurative language.

Some authors have compared Metsarents's work to that of an earlier Western Armenian poet, Bedros Tourian, who also died of tuberculosis at a young age. Hacikyan et al. state that the difference between Metsarents's and Tourian's poetry is great: Tourian complained intensely about his approaching death in his poems, whereas Metsarents "had a gentle and resigned nature and did not allow the thought of premature death to color his poetry." Eastern Armenian authors have drawn parallels with the work of Vahan Terian. According to Jrbashian, Metsarents drew from medieval Armenian poetry, especially the work of Gregory of Narek, and from folk poetry. His own works left their mark on later Western and Eastern Armenian poets, particularly in the realm of natural imagery and the theme of man's relationship with nature. The Eastern Armenian poet Yeghishe Charents was influenced by Metsarents and promoted the publication of his works in Soviet Armenia.

== Legacy ==
Many editions of Metsarents's poetry have been published since his death. His prose writings were collected and published in the volume Voski arishin tak (Under the golden vine arbor) in 1934. His complete works were published in Yerevan in 1934 and again in 1981; another complete collection was published in Antelias in 1986. Individual poems of his have been translated into English, French, German, Russian, and Italian. In 2020, Metsarents's lyric poems were published alongside English translations and commentary by James R. Russell in the volume Misak Medzarents: The Complete Lyric Poems.

In 2012, a commemorative postal stamp bearing Metsarents's portrait was issued in Armenia. A school in Yerevan is named after him.

== See also ==
- Mkrtich Beshiktashlian, an earlier Western Armenian Romantic poet
