= Armenian religion =

Armenian religion may refer to:

- Religion in Armenia
- Armenian Apostolic Church, the national church of Armenia
- Armenian mythology, pre-Christian Armenian religious belief
