= Srpouhi Dussap =

Armenian feminist writer

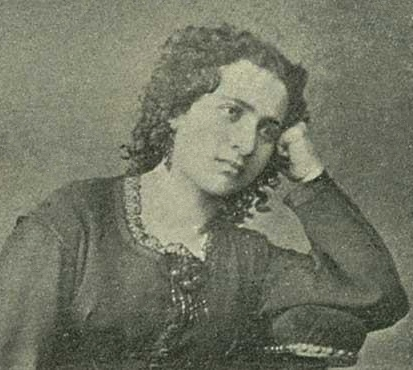
- Born: Srpouhi Vahanian; 1840; Ortakoy, Constantinople, Turkey.
- Died: January 16, 1901 (aged 60–61)
- Resting place: Ferikoy Catholic Cemetery
- Occupations: Novelist, writer, poet
- Spouse: Paul Dussap
- Children: Dorine Dussap, Edgar Dussap

Srpouhi Dussap (Armenian: Սրբուհի Տիւսաբ; 1840–1901) was the first female Armenian novelist and an Armenian feminist writer. She used her works to advocate for women’s education, rights, and independence. Her life's work was influenced by her mother, who advocated for women's education in Constantinople, and her teacher, the Armenian poet Mkrtich Beshiktashlian. She started writing classical Armenian but later advocated for the use of the vernacular Armenian as the new literary language. Her earliest writings are series of essays on the status of women's education and employment. In 1883, she published the first novel by an Armenian woman, Mayda, which treated the theme of women's subordinate position in patriarchal society. Dussap's feminist ideas and her concerns connected to women's lack of independence are portrayed also in her later novels Siranush (1884) and Araksia, or The Governess (1887). Dussap is regarded today as one of the pioneers of Armenian feminism.

== Biography ==
=== Early life and family ===
Dussap was born as Srpouhi Vahanian in the Ortakoy district of Constantinople to a prosperous upper-class Armenian family. At the age of one, she lost her father, Sarkis Vahanyan. He left a considerable legacy, which sustained his family after his death. Dussap's mother, Nazle Vahanyan, was one of the well-educated and progressive women of Constantinople Armenian community. She spoke French and Greek and had a considerable knowledge of European literature. Nazle was also famous for her charity work dedicated to girls' education. In 1859, she founded the Surp Hripsimyants Girls' School. She was respected and loved by her contemporaries for her philanthropic work and community engagement.

=== Education ===
Dussap attended a French school in Ortakoy until the age of 10. Then, her education continued at home. She took individual lessons from her elder brother, Hovhannes Vahanian. As a chemist and a government official, he taught his sister French, Greek, Italian, classical literature, natural sciences, and history. Srpuhi was also gifted in music and played the piano. Later, Dussap was tutored by the Armenian poet Mkrtich Beshiktashlian. Inspired by her mother and teacher, she wanted to do something useful for Armenian society. It is in this period that she starts forming social and political ideologies. In 1868, after Beshiktashlian's death, she wrote a poem in classical Armenian and read it at his funeral. In 1870, Beshiktashlian’s Matenagrutiunk (Works) was published with Dussap’s poem on the first page.

=== Later life ===
Dussap married the French-Levantine pianist and composer, Paul Dussap, in 1871 and took his surname. Paul was the music teacher, composer and director of the Ottoman Emperial Military Band and Court Orchestra. He was Dussap’s music teacher. They had two children Dorine and Edgar. In this later period of her life she continued her philanthropic work and ran a Parisian-style literary salon where the city's prominent intellectuals, writers, and activists would gather to discuss social and political issues, literature, and art. She continued her philanthropic work and ran her salon in her charitable organizations that furthered the support and education of women.

=== Death ===
Dussap died on January 16, 1901, at the age of 60, from cancer. She was buried in the Ferikoy Catholic Cemetery, next to her daughter. Her relatives erected a small monument on her grave with a French epitaph: "To a wonderful wife and mother, to one who possessed all the virtues of the heart and all the graces of the mind. Eternal respect and sorrow."

== Writings ==
Dussap started to write poems in Classical Armenian because of Beshiktashlian’s impact on her. In 1864, her first printed work, Գարուն Karun (Spring), was published in Բազմավեպ Pazmaveb (Polyhistor).

In 1880, Աշխարհաբար հայ լեզուն “Modern Armenian Language” was published, and she defended the use of vernacular Armenian as the new literary language instead of Classical Armenian. Dussap is one of the pioneers of Armenian feminist literature. The earliest of these writings were a series of essays on the status of women's education and employment. In 1880, she published "Women's Education" in Masis. In 1881, she published an article, “A Few Remarks on Women's Idleness,” in Tercüman-i Efkar newspaper, later reprinted in Arevelyan Mamul, which followed another article, “The Principle of Women's Work” Arevelyan Mamul.

In 1883, she published the first novel by an Armenian woman, Mayda, which treated the theme of women's subordinate position in patriarchal society. Dussap's concern with female subordination, inferior education, and lack of financial independence was developed in her later novels Siranush (1884) and Araksia, or The Governess (1887).

She was very much concerned about the situation of the female peasantry of the Ottoman Empire, attacking the traditional patriarchal structures behind their ignorance, and the male oppression that led to forced marriages in the countryside. She further noted that even in the more cultured and cosmopolitan Constantinople, women "were still deprived of their freedom and dominated by men." Dussap was certain that society would not be able to advance without the emancipation of women.

== Others on Dussap ==
Dussap was an inspiration to other Armenian women writers and journalists such as Zabel Yesayan, who recalled reading her in her youth, "We used to read Madame Dussap's books together, and in the work of that feminist author, we tried to find solutions to the problems we faced." Later, she and her friends visited Dussap: "She immediately started asking questions and spoke to us with warmth and encouragement...Hearing that I hoped to become a writer, Madame Dussap tried to warn me. She said that, for women, the world of literature was full of many more thorns than laurels. She told me that in our day and age, a woman who wanted to carve out a place for herself in society was still not tolerated. To overcome all of these obstacles, I needed to exceed mediocrity. ..She made a deep impression on us...We both agreed that in order to exceed mediocrity, we needed to go to Europe to continue our education."

Dussap also inspired Zabel Sibil Asadour, who wrote that as a young woman, she had dreamed of becoming another Srpouhi Dussap. Sibil wrote Տիկին Տյուսաբ իր սրահին մեջ "Madam Dussap in her Salon", where she expresses her admiration of Dussap as a writer, intellectual and a woman.

== Legacy ==
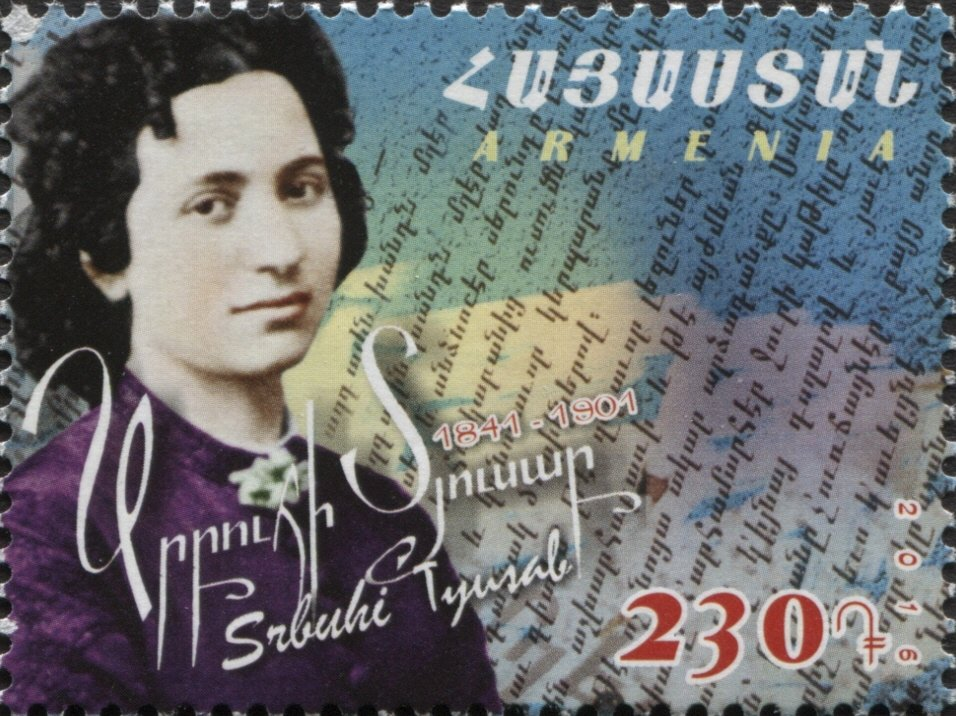
Dussap on a 2016 stamp of Armenia

Srpouhi Dussap's most valuable legacy was the impact she had on young Armenian women who aspired to write. Her immediate legacy to Armenian literature was her introduction of a powerful female voice into the exclusively male Armenian literary and intellectual establishment of Constantinople.

Dussap's legacy continues as she appears in new publications and her works are translated into more languages.

The first English translation of her novel Mayda, by Nareg Seferian, was published in 2020.

Dussap's novel Siranush was republished in 2011 by Graber as a separate book.

Srpouhi Dussap was included in Gayane Aghabalyan's and Elmira Ayvazyan's children's book Armenian Wonderwomen (2023), which celebrates different Armenian women who contributed to Armenian history, literature and science.

== List of works ==
=== Novels ===
- Mayda, Constantinople, 1883, 252 pages
- Siranush, Constantinople, 1884 [1885], 408 pages
- Araxia or the Governess, Constantinople, 1887, 321 pages

=== Articles ===
- "Women's Education", 1880
- "A Few Remarks on Women's Idleness", 1881
- "The Principle of Women's Work", 1881
- "Armenian Societies", 1882

== Bibliography ==
- Translated from Armenian: Արդի հայ գրականութիւն [Modern Armenian Literature], Beirut, 1943, pp. 134–138
