= Hinduism in Armenia =

Hinduism in Armenia remains a minor feature in Armenian religious life, generally represented through the International Society for Krishna Consciousness and a minority of Indian students, with backgrounds in Hinduism.

== History ==
There may have been a community of Indians in Taron, Armenia as early as 2nd century BC.

Per the writings of Zenobius Glak, two Indian princes and their families fled to Armenia from Ujjain in 149 BC. They were granted a grand welcome and given land there. They built a temple for Hindu gods and goddesses in Ashtishat. Eventually, their society grew to 20 villages and was called Hindkastan, the Armenian name for India. At one time, there were over 15,000 Hindus living in Armenia. The Hindu villages flourished until the dawn of Christianity in Armenia in 301 A.D.

== Demographics ==
The International Society for Krishna Consciousness (ISKCON) and Transcendental Meditation organisations are both active in Armenia. In 1990 ISKCON was, for the first time, officially registered as a religion in Armenia. There are now about 250 ISKCON members resident in Armenia and ISKCON maintains congregations in the towns of Gyumri, Vanadzor, Yeghegnadzor, Kapan and Ashtarak. There is one registered Iskcon temple and one place of worship in Armenia.

According to the 2022 Census, there are 204 Hare Krishnas and 22 professing Transcendental Meditation in the country.

== See also ==
- Central Asians in ancient Indian literature
- Hinduism by country
- Zoroastrianism in Armenia
- Buddhism in Armenia
- Religion in Armenia
- Lom people
