= Religion in Armenia =

Religious makeup of Armenia, according to the 2022 census.
1. Armenian Apostolic Church (95.2%)
2. Armenian Catholic Church (0.61%)
3. Armenian Evangelical Church (0.54%)
4. Eastern Orthodox Church (0.22%)
5. Jehovah's Witnesses (0.18%)
6. Other Christians (0.03%)
7. No religion (0.60%)
8. Yazidism (0.49%)
9. Other religions (0.41%)
10. Refused to answer (1.68%)

As of 2022, most Armenians in Armenia are Christians (95.2%) and are members of the Armenian Apostolic Church, which is a member of the family of Oriental Orthodox Churches. It was founded in the 1st century AD, and in 301 AD became the first branch of Christianity to become a state religion.

== Demographics ==
Importance of Religion in Europe (results of a 2008/2009 Gallup poll)

Approximately 98.1% of the country's population is ethnically Armenian, the vast majority of whom belong to the Armenian Apostolic Church.

According to a survey done by the Pew Research Center, 51% of adults in Armenia are "highly religious", and the survey ranked Armenia as the second-most religious out of 34 European countries, after Romania. 79% of Armenians surveyed reported that they believe in God with "absolute certainty", and 53% consider religion very important in their lives.

Census statistics
Religion	Population (2011)		Population (2022)	
Armenian Apostolic Christianity	2,797,187	92.7%	2,793,042	95.2%
Roman Catholic Christianity	13,996	0.5%	17,884	0.6%
Evangelical Christianity	29,280	1%	15,836	0.5%
Yezidism	23,374	0.8%	14,349	0.5%
Eastern Orthodox Christianity	7,587	0.3%	6,316	0.2%
Jehovah's Witnesses	8,695	0.3%	5,282	0.2%
Paganism	5,416	0.2%	2,132	0.1%
Molokan	2,874	0.1%	2,000	0.1%
Nestorian Christianity	1,733	0.06%	524	0.02%
Islam	812	0.03%	515	0.02%
Hare Krishna	-	-	204	0.01%
Judaism	528	0.02%	118	0.01%
Other Protestant Christianity	773	0.03%	280	0.01%
Mormon Christianity	241	0.01%	85	0.01%
Transcendental meditation	-	-	22	0.00%
Other religions	5,299	0.2%	7,288	0.3%
None	34,373	1.1%	17,501	0.6%
Refused to answer	10,941	0.4%	49,353	1.7%
Unspecified	76,273	3.5%	-	-
Total population	3,018,854		2,932,731	

Christianity in Europe by percentage (2010)

=== Geographic distribution ===
Yazidis are concentrated primarily in agricultural areas around Mount Aragats, northwest of Yerevan. They live in 19 villages in the Aragatsotn Province, two villages in the Armavir Province, and one village in the Ararat Province.

Armenian Catholics live mainly in the northern region, in seven villages in the Shirak Province and six villages in the Lori Province.

Molokans live in 10 villages in the Lori Province, two villages in the Shirak Province, and two villages in the Gegharkunik Province.

Most Jews, Mormons, followers of the Bahá'í Faith, Eastern Orthodox Christians, and Latin Catholic Christians reside in the capital Yerevan, which has attracted a greater variety of peoples. Yerevan also has a small community of Muslims, including ethnic Kurds, Iranians, and temporary residents from the Middle East. Foreign missionary groups are active in the country.

== Freedom of religion ==
The Constitution as amended in 2005 provides for freedom of religion and the right to practice, choose, or change religious belief. It recognizes "the exclusive mission of the Armenian Church as a national church in the spiritual life, development of the national culture, and preservation of the national identity of the people of Armenia." The law places some restrictions on the religious freedom of religious groups other than the Armenian Church. The Law on Freedom of Conscience establishes the separation of church and state but it grants the Armenian Church official status as the national church.

== Christianity ==
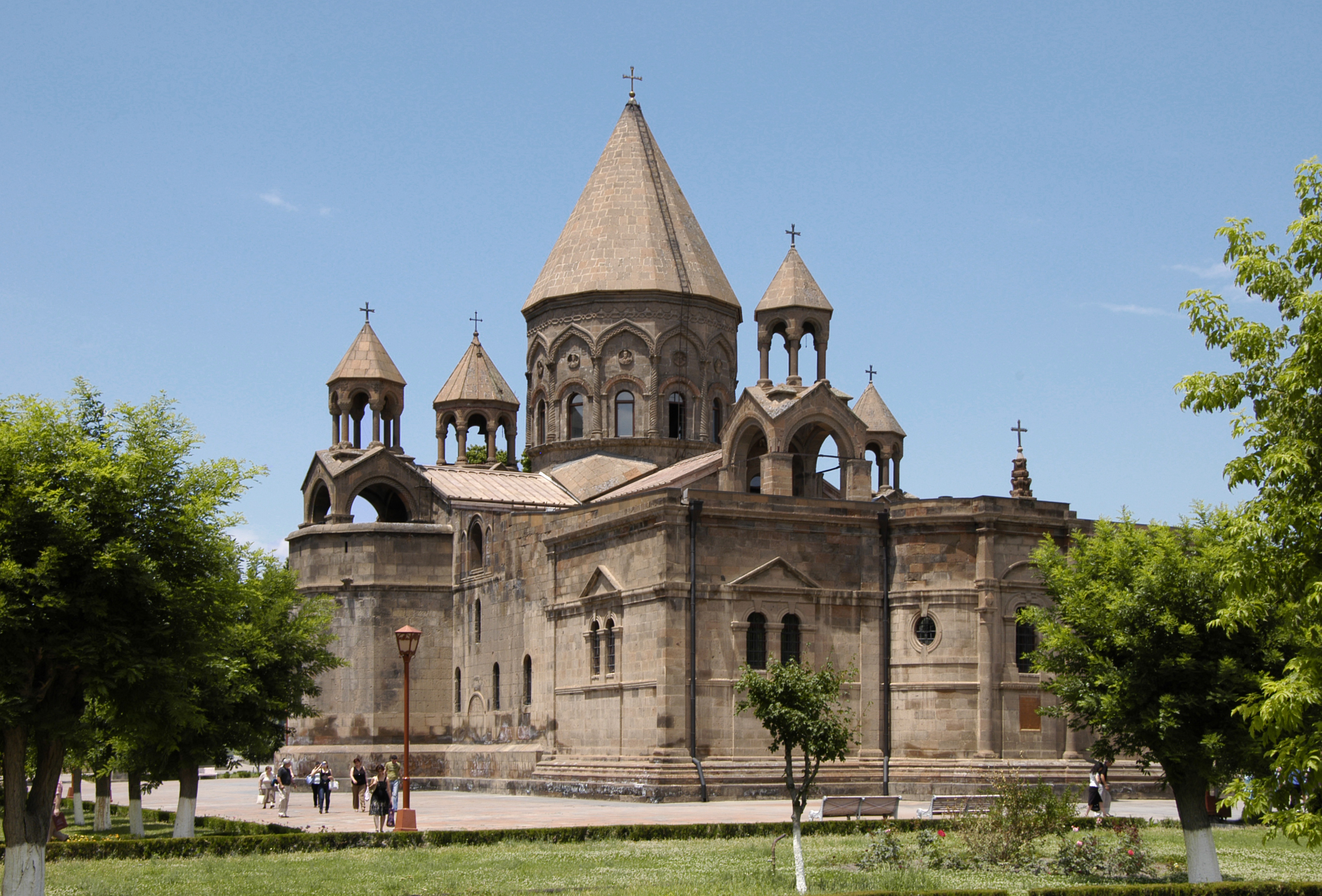
Etchmiadzin Cathedral, the mother church of Armenia

=== Armenian Apostolic Church ===
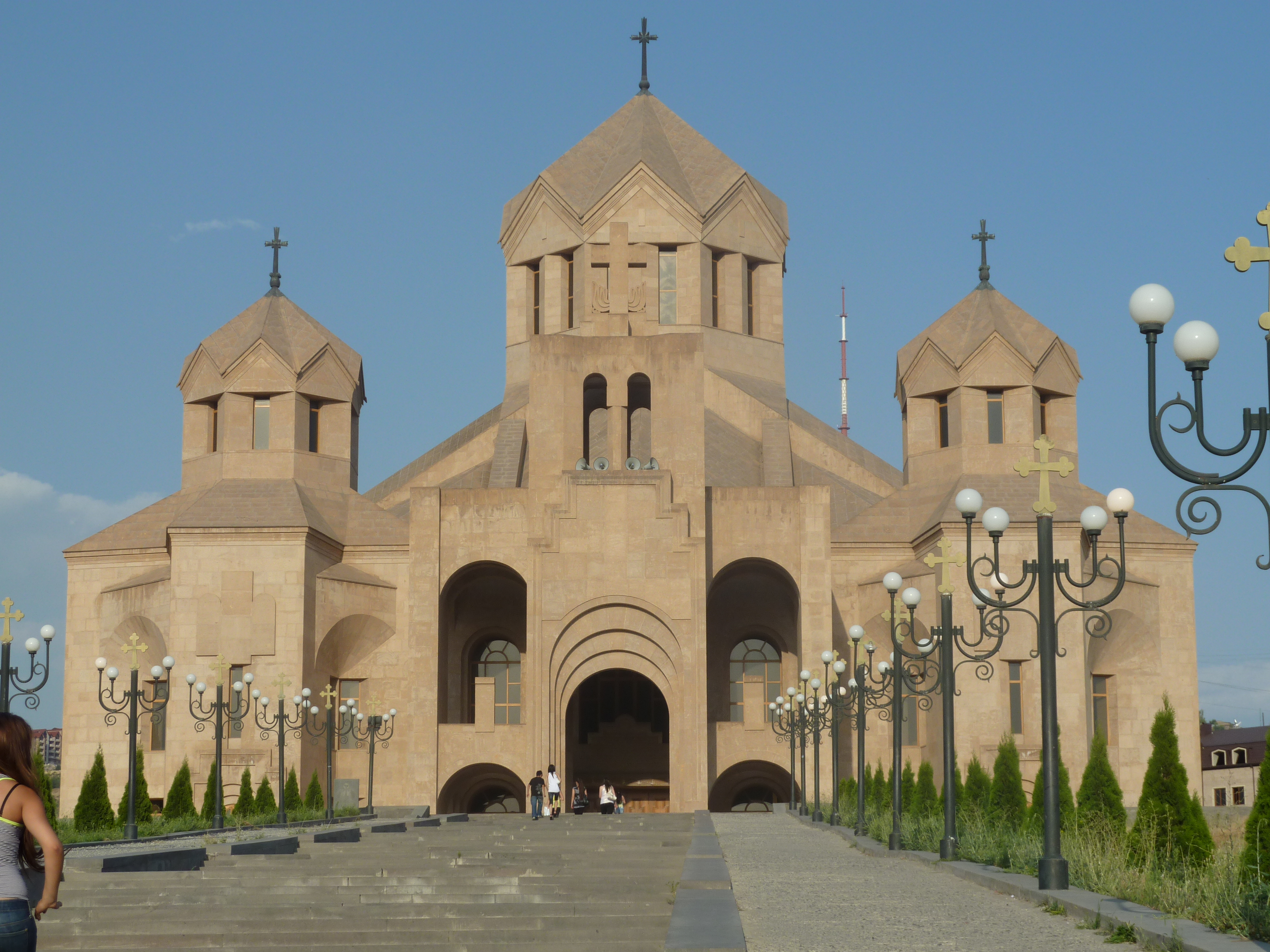
Saint Gregory the Illuminator Cathedral, Yerevan

According to tradition, Christianity was first introduced to this area by the apostles Bartholomew and Thaddeus in the 1st century AD. Armenia became the first country to establish Christianity as its state religion when, in an event traditionally dated to AD 301, St. Gregory the Illuminator convinced Tiridates III, the king of Armenia, to convert to Christianity. Before this, the dominant religion was Armenian paganism.

The Armenian Apostolic Church is the national church of the Armenian people. Part of Eastern Christianity, it is in communion with other Oriental Orthodox churches and is one of the most ancient Christian institutions. The church is "seen by many as the custodian of Armenian national identity". "Beyond its role as a religious institution, the Apostolic Church has traditionally been seen as the foundational core in the development of the Armenian national identity as God's uniquely chosen people."

=== Other denominations ===
==== Catholicism ====
The Catholic Church in Armenia is divided between Latin Church parishes (subject to the Apostolic Administration of the Caucasus) and the Armenian Catholic Church's parishes. The 2022 census counted 17,884 Catholics in Armenia.

In 1911, the Armenian Catholic Church had been split into 19 dioceses. However, many of the dioceses had been dissolved and a number of its followers migrated to different countries during the Armenian genocide in Turkey between the years of 1915 and 1918. The Armenian Catholic Church is led by the 'Patriarch of the Catholic Armenians and Katholikos of Cilicia' and, by convention, the Patriarch has taken up the name of Peter ("Petros").

Abraham Petros I Ardzivian was of great prominence in the formation of a lasting communion with Rome. Having been received into the Catholic faith, he was later made a bishop and was the first patriarch of the Armenian Catholic Church to be consecrated on 26 November 1740. The pallium was granted to him by Pope Benedict XIV on 8 December 1742 marking the recognition of Armenian church unity. This was the first step in the Union of the Latin and Armenian Catholic Church that persists unbroken until the current day.

Throughout the world, the Armenian Catholic church is divided into four archeparchies and six eparchies, as well as lesser exarchates and ordinariates. Despite the events of the Armenian genocide, the Armenian Catholic Church continued to spread across Armenian diaspora communities throughout the world.

==== Eastern Orthodoxy ====
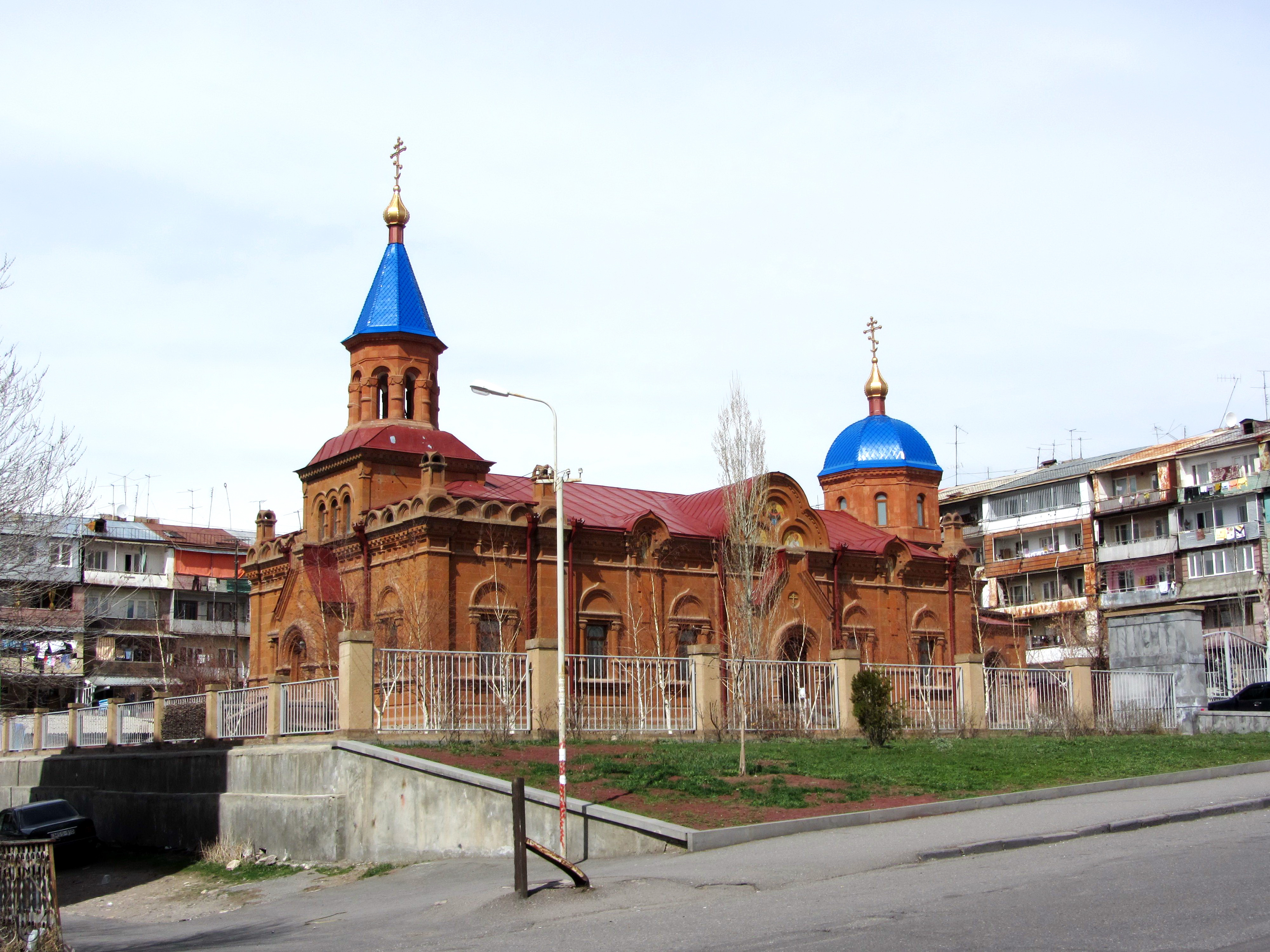
The Russian Orthodox Church of the Intercession of the Holy Mother of God, in suburban Yerevan

According to the Census of 2022, there are 6,316 adherents of Eastern Orthodoxy in Armenia, mainly Russians, Ukrainians, Georgians and Greeks. Russian Orthodox community is centered around Church of the Intercession of the Holy Mother of God in Yerevan, consecrated in 1912.

==== Molokans ====
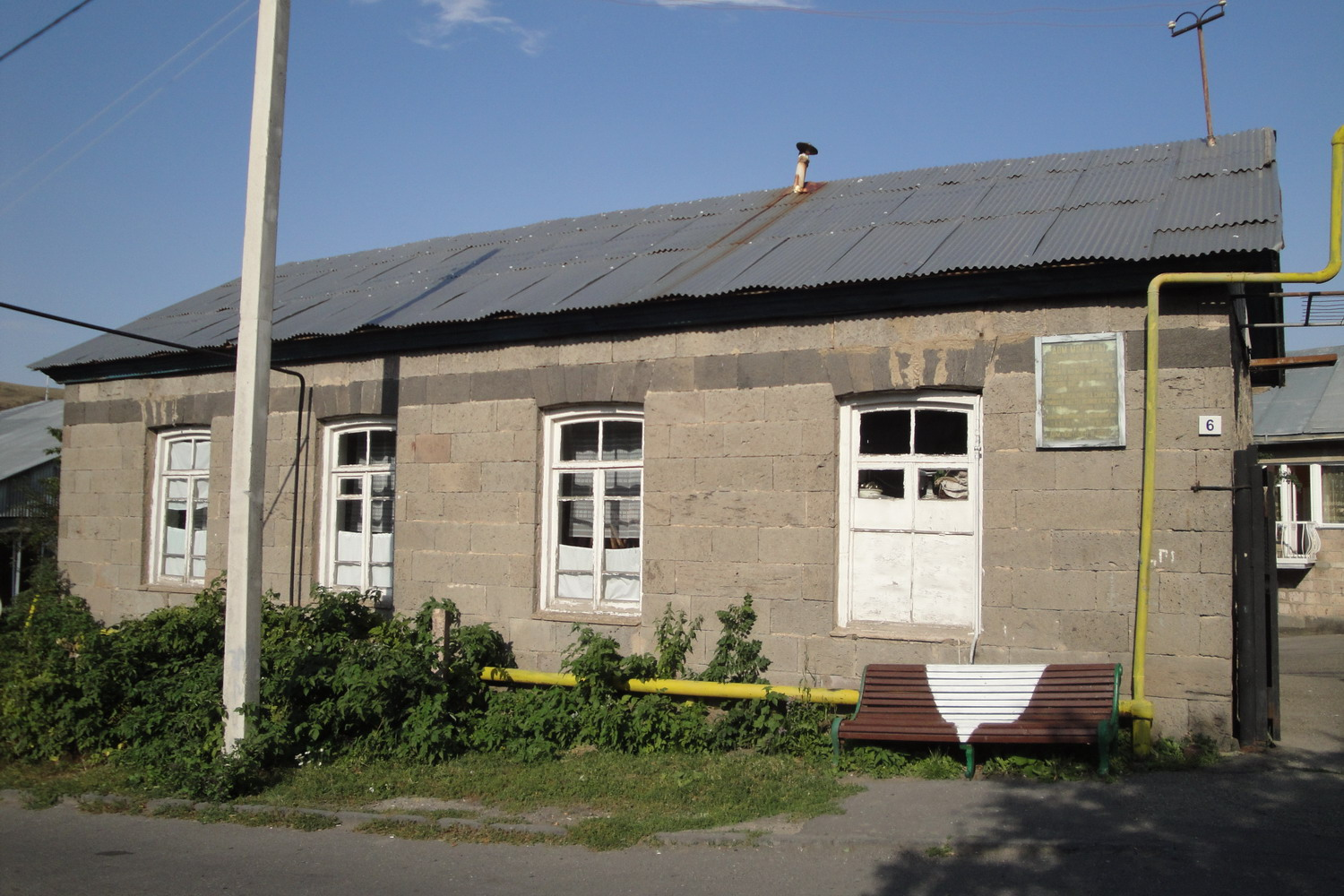
Molokan meetinghouse in Tsaghkadzor

The Molokans, a Russian religious group who reject church hierarchy and some Russian Orthodox practices, have a presence in Armenia dating from the early 19th century. Armenian Molokans have low intermarriage rates, and are generally educated in Russian-language schools; most are fluent in both Russian and Armenian. Molokans maintain a communal identity, and rural Molokan villages continue with a traditional lifestyle.

The 2022 census counted 2,000 Molokans.

In 1802, Alexander I ordered that adherents of religious sects should be relocated to southern areas of the Russian Empire; Armenian regions such as Lori, Lake Sevan, Dilijan, and Zangezur were chosen for new Russian settlements. Mass migration of Molokans (as well as Doukhobors, Khlysts, and Skoptsy) to the Caucasus took place in the 1830s, when Nicholas I focused efforts on resettlement, particularly to Armenia. 19th-century Molokan settlements include the villages of Vorontsovka, Nikitino, Voskresenovka, Privolnoye, Elenovka, Semyonovka, Nadezhdino, and Mikhailovka.

The Molokans of Armenia supported the establishment of the Soviet Union, and were active in the Revolutionary movement. Soviet dekulakization policy in the 1920s caused discontentment among the Molokans, and some wanted to emigrate to Russia or Persia; eventually, most chose to stay in Soviet Armenia. Beginning in the 1930s Molokans migrated in large numbers to cities due to collectivization of rural land.

==== Assyrians ====
According to the Census of 2022, there are 524 Assyrians in Armenia.

==== Protestantism ====
The 2022 census counted 15,836 Evangelicals and 280 other Protestants.

==== Restorationism ====
The 2022 census found 5,282 Jehovah's Witnesses.

The 2022 census found 85 followers of The Church of Jesus Christ of Latter-day Saints.

== Other religions ==
=== Hetanism ===
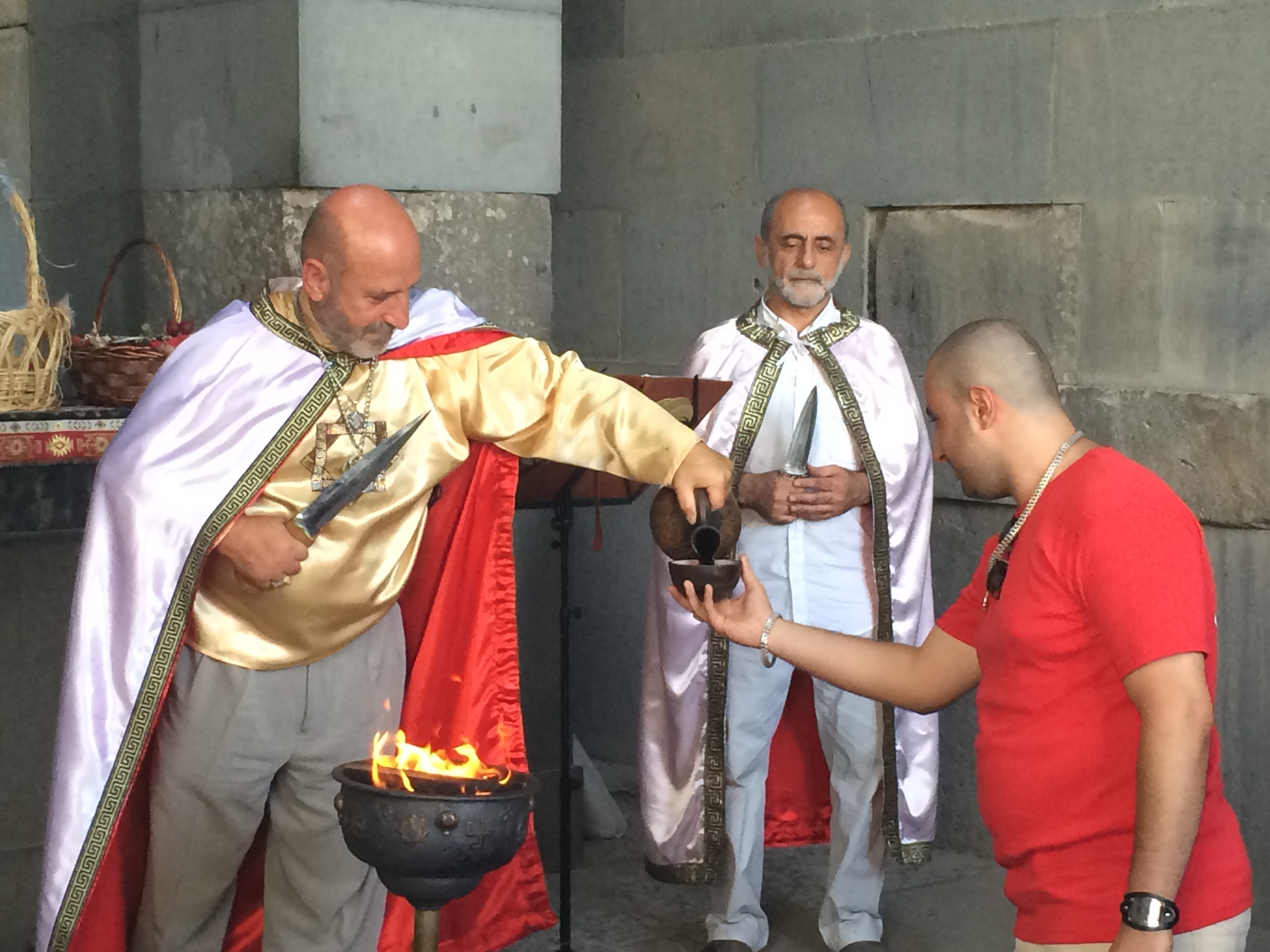
Hetan priest conducting a ceremony at Garni Temple

Hetanism (Հեթանոսություն, Hetanosutyun) is a neo-pagan movement in Armenia. Adherents call themselves "Hetans" (Hetanos հեթանոս, the Old Armenian biblical term loaned from Greek ἐθνικός "gentile"). The movement traces its origins back to the work of the early-20th-century political philosopher and revolutionary Garegin Nzhdeh and his doctrine of tseghakron (rejuvenation through national religion). In 1991, it was institutionalized by the Armenologist Slak Kakosyan into the "Order of the Children of Ari" (Arordineri Ukht). The movement is strongly associated to Armenian nationalism. It finds some support from nationalist political parties of Armenia, particularly the Republican Party of Armenia and the Armenian Aryan Union.

=== Yazidism ===
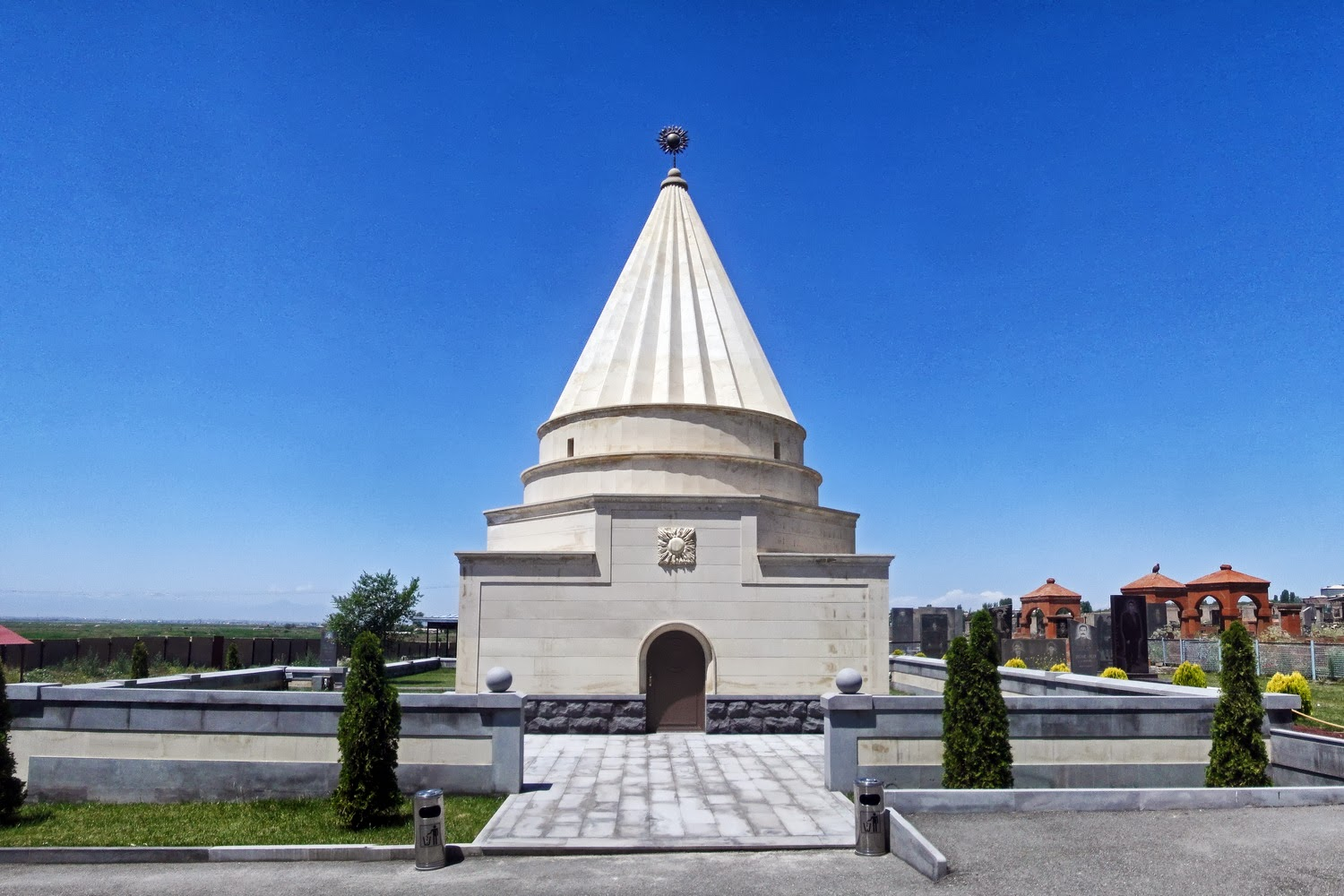
Yazid's temple Ziarat in the village of Aknalich

As per census of 2022, about 0.5% of Armenia's population (14,349 as per the 2022 census), follows Yazidism. Many Yazidis came to Armenia and Georgia during the 19th and early 20th centuries to escape religious persecution. Relations between Yazidis and Armenians are strong. The world's largest Yazidi temple Quba Mêrê Dîwanê is constructed in the small village of Aknalich.

=== Judaism ===
Currently there are an estimated 118 Jews in the country, a remnant of a once larger community. Most left Armenia for Israel after the collapse of the Soviet Union in pursuit of better living standards. Still, despite the small numbers, high intermarriage rate and relative isolation, a lot of enthusiasm exists to help the community meet its needs.

=== Islam ===
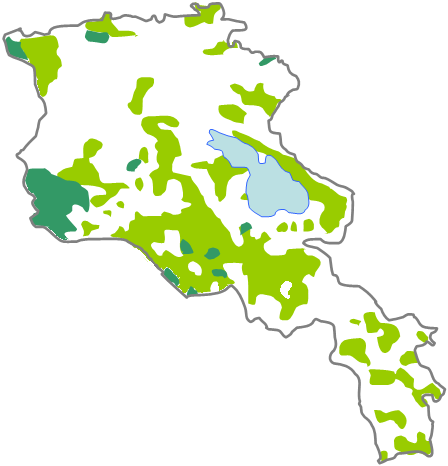
Distribution of Muslims in modern borders of Armenia, 1886–1890. Shias Sunnis

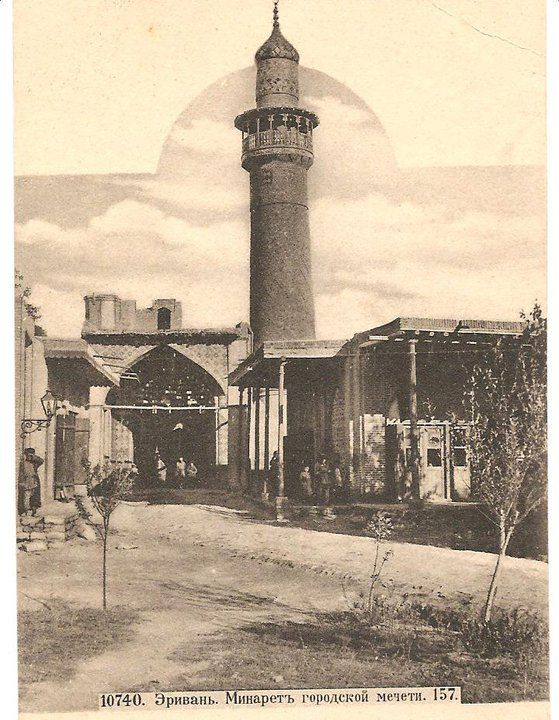
Minaret of the Urban Mosque in Yerevan

According to the Census of 2022, there are 515 adherents of Islam in Armenia.

Azerbaijanis and Kurds living in Armenia traditionally practised Islam, but most Azerbaijanis, who were the largest minority in the country, fled during the First Nagorno-Karabakh War. In 2009, the Pew Research Center estimated that less than 0.1% of the population, or about 1,000 people, were Muslims.

The 18th century Blue Mosque is open for Friday prayers.

Throughout history, Armenians did not convert to Islam in large numbers despite long periods of Muslim rule. During the Arabic conquest, Islam came to the Armenians; however, very few Armenians converted to Islam, since Christians were not required to convert by Muslim law.

There is, however, a minority of ethnic Armenian Muslims, known as Hamshenis, the vast majority of which live outside of Armenia mostly in Turkey, and to a lesser extent, in Russia.

=== Baháʼí Faith ===
The Baháʼí Faith in Armenia begins with some involvements in the banishments and execution of the Báb, the Founder of Bábism, viewed by Baháʼís as a precursor religion. The same year of the execution of the Báb the religion was introduced into Armenia. During the period of Soviet policy of religious oppression, the Baháʼís in Armenia lost contact with the Baháʼís elsewhere. However, in 1963 communities were identified in Yerevan and Artez. Following Perestroika, the first Baháʼí Local Spiritual Assemblies of Armenia form in 1991 and Armenian Baháʼís elected their first National Spiritual Assembly in 1995.

=== Hinduism ===
With shared interests in many aspects, Indians and Armenians established economic and cultural ties almost 4000 years ago. Per the writings of Zenobius Glak, an early classical Armenian writer, two princes and their families fled to Armenia in 149 BC. They were granted a grand welcome and given land there. They built a temple for Hindu gods and goddesses in Ashtishat, a famous religious center in Armenia. Eventually, their society grew to 20 villages and was called Hindkastan, the Armenian name for India. At one time, there were over 15,000 Hindus living in Armenia.

== See also ==
- Buddhism in Armenia
- Hinduism in Armenia
- Zoroastrianism in Armenia
- Religion in Artsakh
- Religion by country
