= Shakyasimha =

Shakyasimha (Tib. Sakyasenge). is a symbol of a lion representing the king of all beasts. The 'Lion of the Sakya Clan'. The lion in this aspect is used as a symbol of Buddhism itself. Like a Buddha, Padmasambhava as the Second Buddha, is also called Shakyasimha. Shakyasimha was also the name given to the guru Padmakara (Tib. Pema Jungne, also Padmasambhava), who was revered throughout the Himalayan world as Second Buddha and introduced the meditative practices of Mahayoga and Atiyoga from Oddiyana and India into Tibet and Bhutan during the eighth century.
