= Peace Revolution =

Online meditation platform aimed at young adults

- Website type: Online meditation platform
- Owner: World Peace Initiative Foundation
- Website: peacerevolution.net
- Commercial: No
- Registration: Required for most features
- Launched: 2008

Peace Revolution is an online meditation platform aimed at young adults. The platform's primary focus is on the teaching of Samatha meditation but is also involved in other activities and events related to mindfulness and peace-building. Although the platform has a secular orientation, it does draw on principles of Buddhism. Buddhist monks from Thailand are often invited to lead meditation and mindfulness activities.

The idea the platform is built on is that sustainable world peace can only be established by first achieving mindfulness, or "inner peace", at the individual level; after which peace can be achieved at the community level and greater. This is expressed through Peace Revolution's slogan Peace In, Peace Out (PIPO).

Peace Revolution offers a number of offline and online activities and programs to facilitate this goal.

== History ==
Peace Revolution was established in 2008 by the World Peace Initiative Foundation, a non-profit organization which operates mainly from Thailand. The initial idea for the creation of the website was that with current developments in modern education, the focus on mental well-being had become less important. With a growing availability of Internet connections throughout the world, meditation could be easily introduced in this way. The platform is known for introducing meditation as a secular hobby for people in regions where meditation is not widely known. The World Peace Initiative and Peace Revolution have partnerships with several organizations internationally, including the European Commission.

As of 2016, the platform had 87,521 participants, from 235 countries and territories and had organized 104 events worldwide. Peace Revolution's operations are maintained by a worldwide network connected through their website.

== Activities ==
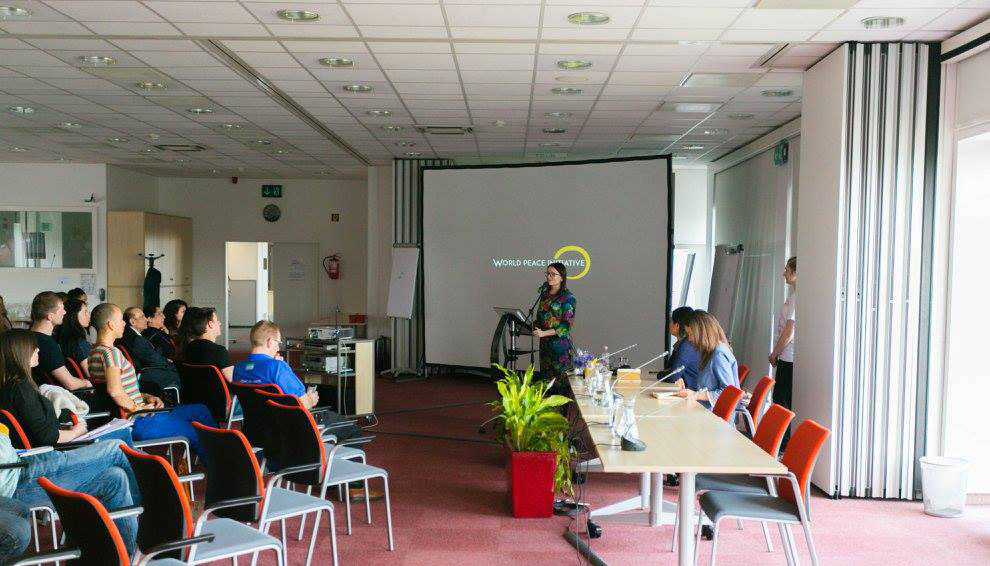
Presentation being given during the European Peace Summit 2016

=== Online meditation program ===
Peace Revolution runs a forty-two-day online self-development program based on its "Peace In, Peace Out" philosophy, which focuses on meditation, daily self-discipline to deepen meditation experiences, and other activities for self-reflection. Subject matter discussed include incorporating meditation into one's daily life, the relation between body and mind, the training of habits, karma, a culture of peace and conflict resolution. (Note: See Romanello, Carla (31 May 2016). "Viaje de autoayuda: se fue a Tailandia con una beca para meditar" [Self-help trip: he went to Thailand with a scholarship to meditate]. Los Andes (in Spanish). Archived from the original on 29 August 2018 and Jessica, Almeida (17 July 2015). "A qualquer hora e lugar" [Anytime, anywhere]. O Tempo (in Brazilian Portuguese). Archived from the original on 2017-04-04. For karma, see "Taizemes budistu mūks Džons novembrī un decembrī aicina uz bezmaksas meditācijām Latvijā" [In November and December, a Buddhist monk of Thailand organizes free meditations in Latvia]. Veselam (in Latvian). 23 October 2018. Archived from the original on 10 December 2019.) Meditation, referred to as Inner Peace Time on the platform, makes up the central theme of Peace Revolution's activities. The meditation technique used on the platform is Dhammakaya meditation.

Several online meditation resources are available on the Peace Revolution website, including a written walk-through on meditation and guided meditations in various languages. Optional offline components of the program include special assignments which the participants complete in their own surroundings, called Special Ops. Such activities include inviting others to meditate, and collaborative art or community service projects with the theme of inner peace.

=== Other activities ===
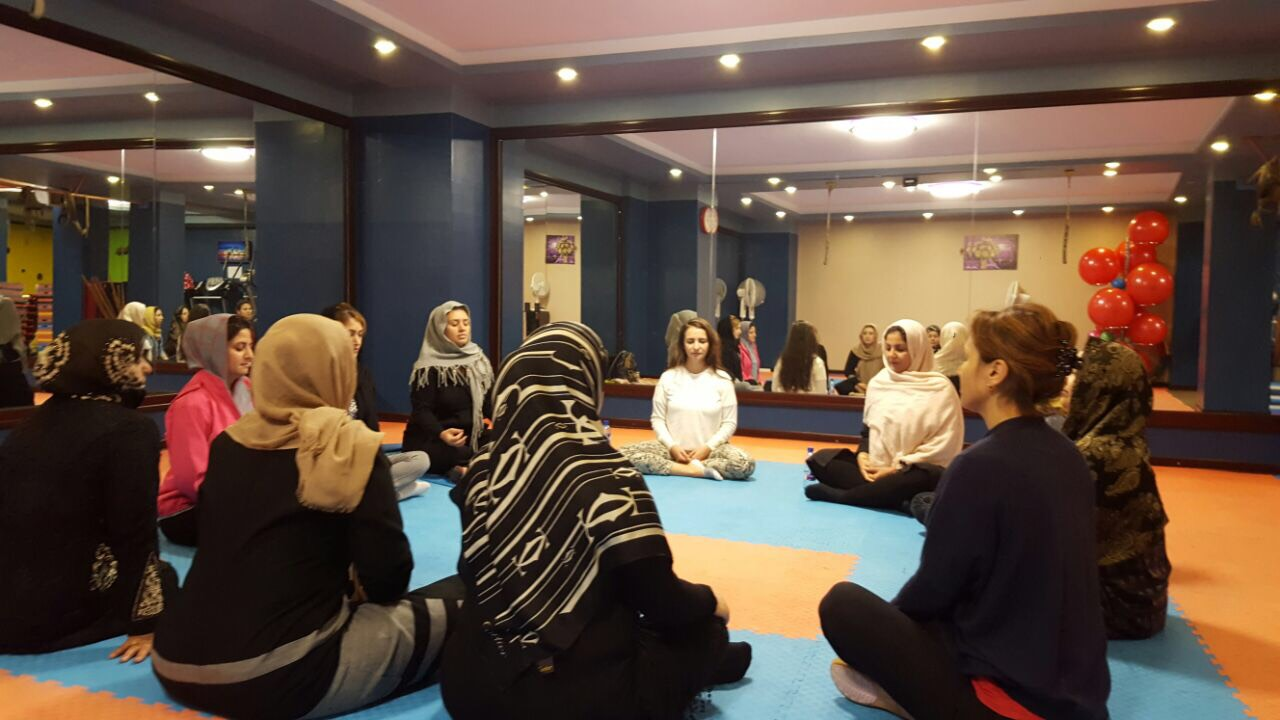
Participants meditating at a Peace Revolution Peace on Demand event in Iran

Peace Revolution offers numerous fellowships hosted around the world. Peace Revolution Fellowships typically range from three to fourteen days and include a meditation retreat.

The platform is also active in various Peace Summits across the world, often in partnership with local organizations. Summits typically last four days and feature numerous guest speakers from the World Peace Initiative Foundation, as well as speakers from different like-minded organizations from the region. The topics typically discussed in the peace summits include peace-building, specific issues related to the region, and the benefits of meditation in these peace-building processes.

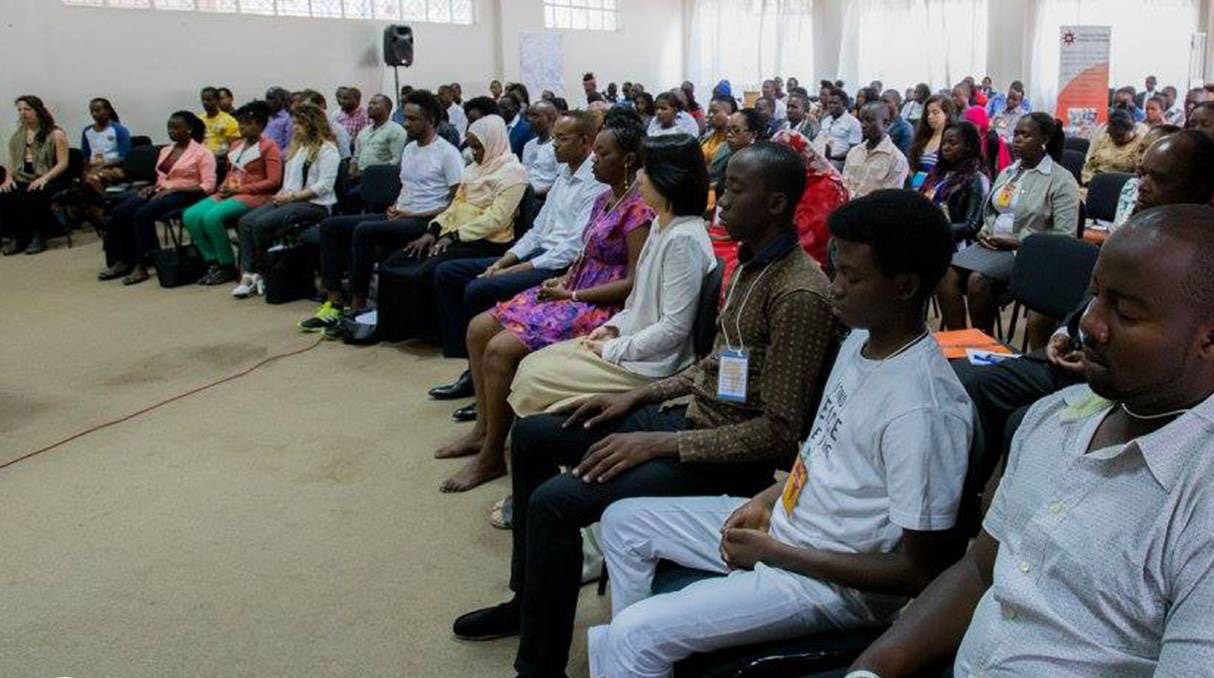
Participants meditating at the 2016 African Peace Summit

In addition to these summits, Peace Revolution also sponsors events for participants who wish to organize their own meditation events and workshops in their local areas, providing meditation instructors and assisting participants in organizing their events. Instructors provided include Buddhist monks and certified meditation instructors of different backgrounds. Such events are referred to as Peace on Demand events (also called a PIPO event).

Peace Revolution's first Peace on Demand event was held in Egypt in 2010 during the International Day of Peace. In the following years, numerous local events have been organized worldwide, with events being held in forty-six different countries in 2015. Peace Revolution sponsored events have been held in various settings, such as for companies to provide training for its employees, and in universities, schools and prisons.

== Notable events ==
Some events that Peace Revolution has sponsored or helped coordinate are meditation workshops in refugee camps for African children and a broadcast on Albanian national television. Other examples are a vigil in Muea-Buea, Cameroon, to commemorate victims after a bombing of the Boko Haram in 2015, and guided meditation that took place during a film festival emphasizing human rights in Barcelona. Peace Revolution volunteers have also organized peace walks to promote their message. From 2018 onward, a yearly meditation week was organized in Argentina, in which guided meditations were organized in public spaces, educational institutions, hospitals, companies and prisons. This was done in cooperation with the New Future Society, based in the USA and Argentina. Branded as the "#MEME Marathon de la Calma" ('Marathon of Calm'), the event is organized in cooperation with government officials from the province and municipalities.

== Structure ==
Although Peace Revolution and its programs are run by full-time employees based at its headquarters, the organization relies heavily on a large network of volunteers worldwide to organize its programs and events. Online members are referred to as "Peace Rebels", which according to the website, is because every revolution is made up of rebels and the participants make up the Peace Revolution. Participants are connected through the website's online networking platform, the Rebel Hub, where Peace Rebels can communicate and plan mindfulness-based projects and ideas, and an online forum where they can discuss their meditation experiences. Questions about meditation are answered online by "Peace Coaches". Active members who meet certain requirements can undergo training to become certified meditation instructors, known as "Peace Architects".

== See also ==
- Ānāpānasati
- Buddhist ethics
- Dhammakaya meditation
- Dhammayietra, annual peace walk in Cambodia
- Sacca-kiriyā
- Samatha & Vipassanā
