= Diran Chrakian =

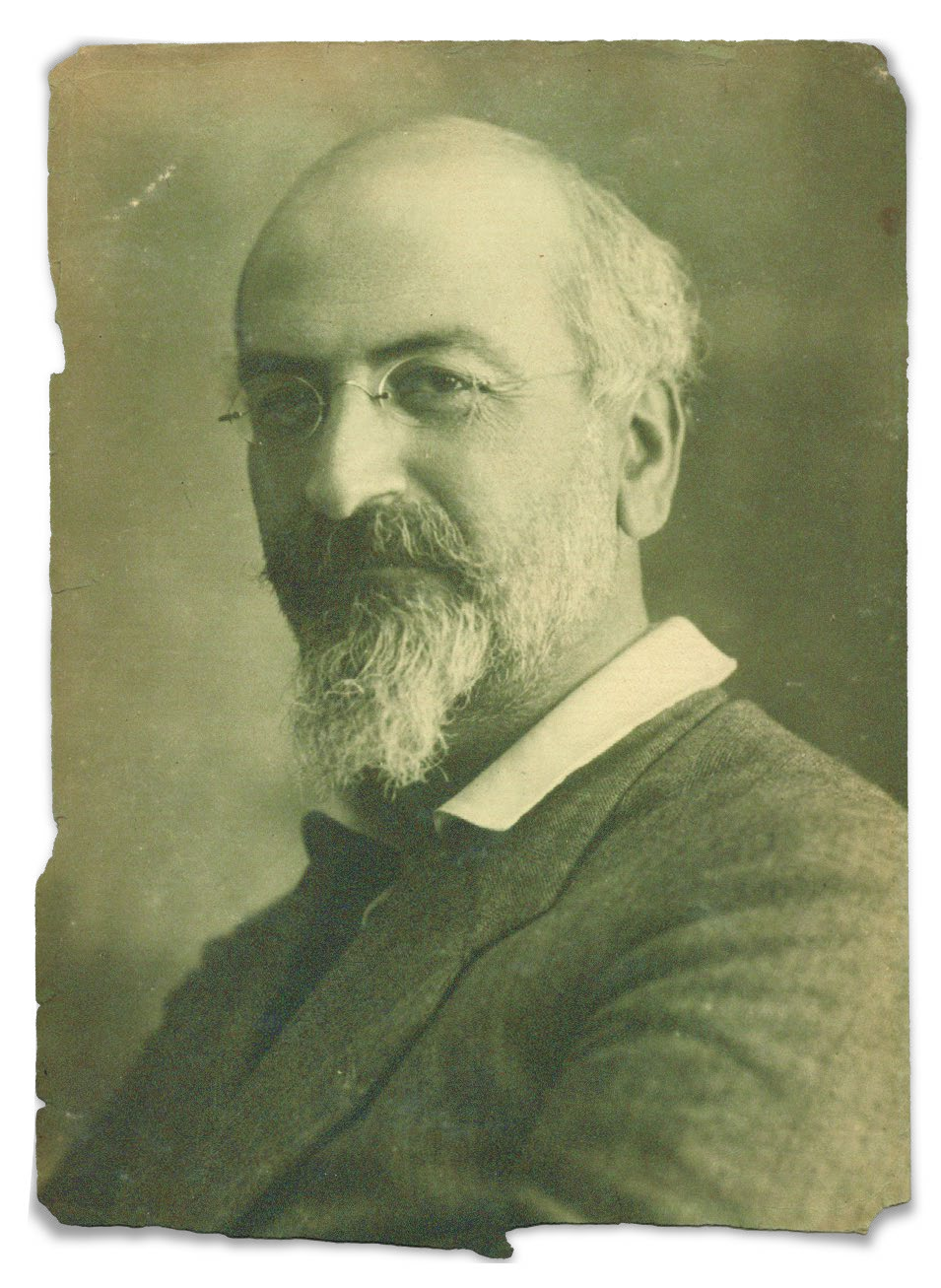
Diran Chrakian

Diran Chrakian, also known by the pseudonym Indra (Armenian: Ինտրա, 1875, in Constantinople, Ottoman Empire – 1921), was an Armenian poet, writer, painter and teacher, and a victim of Armenian genocide.

== Biography ==
Diran Chrakian (alt spelling: Tcharakian) (Armenian: Տիրան Չրաքեան) was educated at Berberian College of Constantinople, then finished the College of Arts, where his works were appreciated by the famous painter Hovhannes Aivazovsky. Indra worked as a teacher, wrote articles, literary researches and notes. He signed his books "Inner World" (Ներաշխարհ, essays, 1906) and "Cypress Wood" (Նոճաստան, sonnets 1908), with the pseudonym Indra (anagram of his first name).

He became a prominent member of the Seventh-day Adventist church in the Ottoman Empire, having joined the church in 1913.

After the Armenian genocide of 1915, he was forced on a 1,000 kilometre death march. He died on the banks of the river Tigris at Diyarbakır in 1921.

== Sources ==
- Ցեղին սիրտը Western Armenian poetry, Yerevan, Arevik publ., 1991, ISBN 5-8077-0300-6, p. 705 (biography in Armenian)
- The Heritage of Armenian Literature: Volume III—From the Eighteenth Century to Modern Times, Edited by Agop J. Hacikyan, Edward S. Franchuk, Nourhan Ouzounian, and Gabriel Basmajian
