= Mkrtich Beshiktashlian =

Armenian writer

- Մկրտիչ Պէշիկթաշլեան
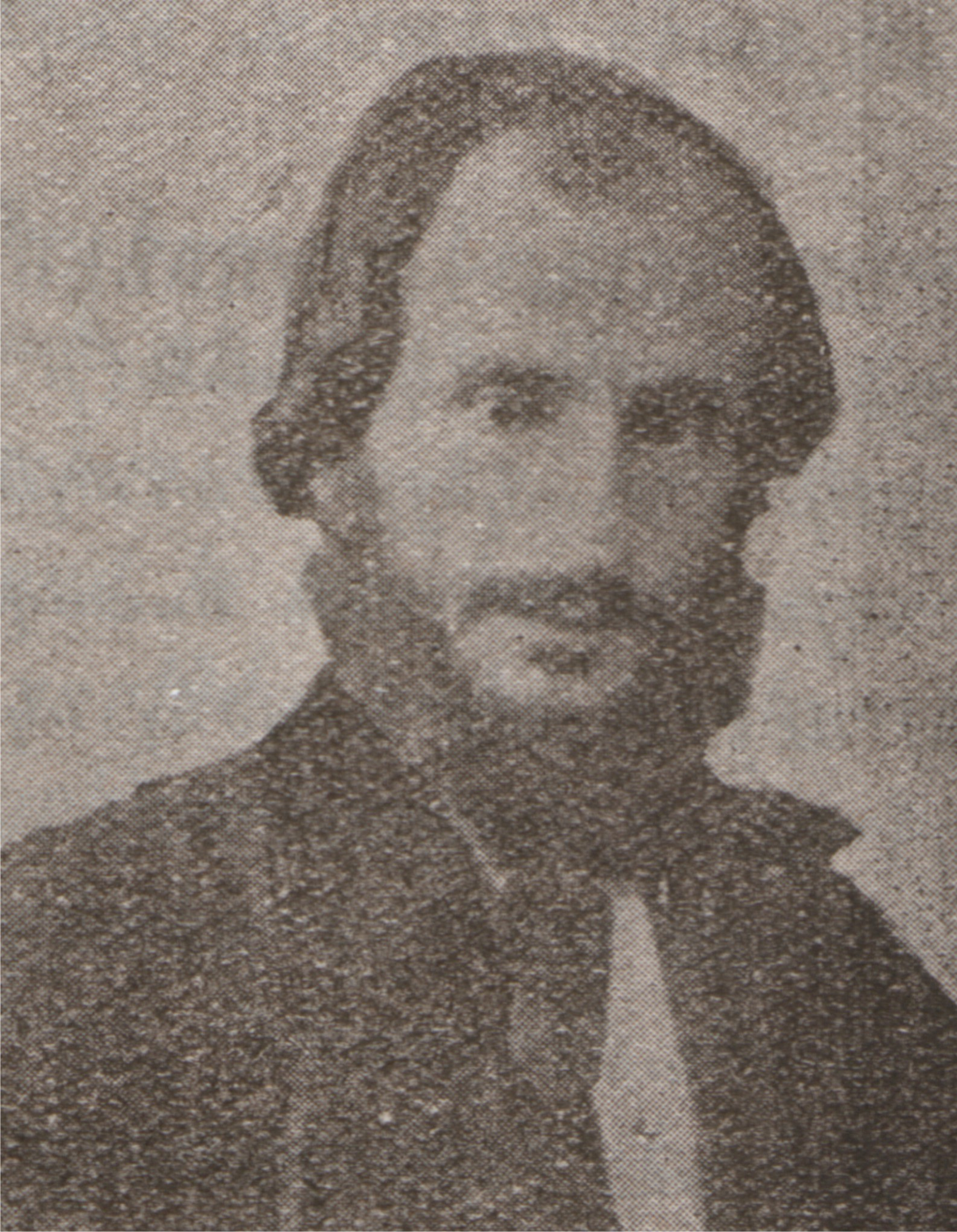
- Born: August 18, 1828; Constantinople, Ottoman Empire
- Died: November 29, 1868 (aged 40); Constantinople, Ottoman Empire
- Citizenship: Ottoman
- Occupations: Poet, educator
- Style: Romanticism

Mkrtich Beshiktashlian (Note: Reformed orthography: Մկրտիչ Պեշիկթաշլյան. Also spelled Mgrdich, Mugurdich, Mugurditch, Megerdich, Mekertitch; Peshiktashlian, Peshiktashlyan.) (Armenian: Մկրտիչ Պէշիկթաշլեան; 18 August 1828 – 29 November 1868) was an Ottoman Armenian poet, playwright and educator from Constantinople. Considered one of the main representatives of the Romanticist movement in Armenian literature, his work was highly influential on later Armenian authors.

== Biography ==
Mkrtich Beshiktashlian was born on 18 August 1828 in the Ortaköy neighborhood of Constantinople. His father, Raphael Beshiktashlian, was one of 12,000 Armenians deported to Constantinople from Anatolia in 1827. Mkrtich's parents and sisters died during his youth. He received his education at institutions run by the Mekhitarist Armenian Catholic order, first in Constantinople, then at the Muradian Gymnasium in Padua, Italy.

He returned to Constantinople in 1846, and the next year he founded the "All-national Society" (Armenian: Համազգեաց ընկերութիւն) cultural organization, which contributed to the contemporary religious, social and literary debates of Constantinople Armenians. In 1856, he founded an Armenian professional theater in Constantinople. Beshiktashlian wrote or translated into Armenian a total of nine dramas, and wrote two comedies. He is considered one of the founders of modern Armenian theater.

Besides his cultural and literary activities, Beshiktashlian also worked as a teacher of Armenian and French at various Armenian schools in Constantinople. Among his students was Srpouhi Dussap, who would go on to become the first female Armenian novelist and one of the major figures of Western Armenian literature.

The Zeitun Rebellion of 1862 by Armenians in the region of Cilicia inspired Beshiktashlian to write a series of famous patriotic poems and songs dedicated to the rebels. Beshiktashlian made contact with delegates from Zeitun who came to Constantinople, and conferred with a Polish prince about joint revolutionary activity between Armenians and Poles.

In 1866, Beshiktashlian joined the newly founded "Ser" (Love) Masonic lodge, which mostly consisted of other Constantinople Armenian intellectuals. Its members wrote on various social, economic, political and philosophical subjects, and advocated for reforms for the Armenians living in the provinces.

He died of tuberculosis in 1868 at the age of 40. He was buried in an Armenian cemetery in the Şişli district of Constantinople.

== Works ==
=== Historical Tragedies ===
- «Կոռնակ» (Kornak)
- «Արշակ» (Arshak)
- «Վահէ» (Vahe)
- «Վահան» (Vahan)

=== Translations ===
- Voltaire's The Death of Caesar
- Vittorio Alfieri's Saul and Bruto, part I

=== Musical comedies ===
- «Կատակերգութիւն Երից Քաջաց» - Comedy about Three Brave Men
- «Կատակերգութիւն Աւազակաց» (1909) - Comedy about the Bandits

=== Poems ===
- «Զբօսանք Արտաշէսի Առաջնոյ» (1849) - "Artashes I's Walk"
- «Հրաւէր ի Մարտ Խոսրովու Մեծի» - "Khosrov the Great's Call to Battle"
- «Ի Նահատակութիւն Վարդանանց» - "To the Martyrdom of Vardan and his Men"
- «Դիւցազունք Հայոց» - "Armenian Heroes"
- «Գիշեր» - "Night"
- «Առ Հ. Ղեւոնդ Ալիշան» - "To Ghevond Alishan"
- «Եղբայր Եմք Մենք» - "We Are Brothers"
- «Գարուն» - "Spring"
- «Ալ զեփիւռն Ալեմտաղիի» - "The Crimson Zephyr of Alemdaghi"
- «Ճեմք Ի Լեառն Հսկային» - "A Stroll to the Giant's Mountain"
- «Հնացէք Իմ Տաղք» - "Grow Old, My Verses"
- «Աշուն» - "Autumn"
- «Քնար Կուսին» - "The Virgin's Lyre"
- «Քնար Եւ Շիրիմ» - "Lyre and Grave"
- «Հայ Քաջորդին» - "The Brave Armenian Son"
- «Մահ Քաջորդւոյն» - "The Brave Son's Death"
- «Թաղումն Քաջորդւոյն» - "The Burial of the Brave Son"
- «Հայ Քաջուհին» - "The Brave Armenian Girl"
