= Battle for Zangezur (1921) =

- Part of the aftermath of the February Uprising
- A map of the conflict.
Date	April 26–July 16, 1921
Location	Zangezur, Armenia
Result	Soviet victory
Territorial changes	Zangezur assigned to Soviet Armenia, autonomy of the region dissolved

Belligerents
Republic of Mountainous Armenia	Russian Soviet Federative Socialist Republic

Commanders and leaders
Garegin Nzhdeh	Sergo Ordzhonikidze; Mikhail Velikanov; Alexander Todorsky; Anatoly Gekker; Dmitri Mirimanov

Units involved
Armed Forces of Mountainous Armenia	Separate Caucasus Army: Yerevan Group/Division; Karabakh-Zangezur Division

Strength
9,500–12,000 (peak)	19,500 (peak)

Casualties and losses
8,042 refugees/personnel crossed Araxes into Persia, 2 drowned trying ~4,000 captured by Soviet forces	2,000 captured by rebel forces 1,853 deserted Disease losses exceeded combat fatalities
- Zangezur’s Azerbaijani minority expelled and/or massacred by Nzhdeh’s forces

The Battle for Zangezur (Note: (Armenian: Լեռնահայաստանի հերոսամարտ, romanized: Lernahayastani herosamart or Զանգեզուրիի գոյապայքարը, romanized: Zangezuri goyamarty; Russian: Разгром дашнаков в Зангезуре летом, romanized: Razgrom dashnakov v Zangezure letom)) was a military conflict fought between April 26 and July 16, 1921 for control of the strategic and rugged region of Zangezur (Syunik). The war was waged between Armenian national forces, initially part of the First Republic of Armenia and later organized as the Republic of Mountainous Armenia, and the Soviet Red Army.

The conflict is historically significant for ensuring that the Zangezur region remained an integral part of Armenia rather than being annexed by Soviet Azerbaijan. Led by the military commander Garegin Nzhdeh, the Armenian resistance transformed Zangezur into the last bastion of Armenian independence after the fall of the central government in Yerevan in December 1920.

== Background ==
=== Soviet invasion of Armenia ===
Following the sovietization of Azerbaijan in April 1920, the 11th Red Army took up positions along the frontiers of the Armenian republic. The Soviet leadership in Moscow, while engaged in negotiations with the Armenian mission led by Levon Shant, authorized the Red Army to occupy the "disputed" territories of Karabagh, Zangezur, and Nakhichevan. For the Soviets, control of these regions was vital to opening a strategic land corridor to their ally, the Turkish Nationalist movement of Mustafa Kemal Pasha.

In June 1920, the Red Army's 32nd Rifle Division began its advance into Zangezur. Despite local Armenian protests, a Soviet scouting party entered the village of Tegh on June 29, and by July 5, the Red Army occupied Goris, the administrative center of the district.

The initial period of Soviet occupation was marked by political repression. The Cheka (extraordinary committee) carried out numerous arrests of Armenian nationalists and socialist opponents. In early August, the Red Army executed prominent Armenian figures, including Parliament members Arshak Shirinian and Vahan Khoreni, whose bodies were discovered with signs of torture.

On August 10, 1920, the Armenian government in Yerevan, pressured by the simultaneous Turkish invasion on its western front, signed a preliminary treaty in Tiflis. This accord gave the Armenian government's "temporary" consent to the Soviet occupation of Zangezur and Karabagh, hoping to stabilize relations with Moscow while focusing on the Turkish threat.

While regular Armenian army units under Dro withdrew to Daralagyaz following the August treaty, Garegin Nzhdeh refused to abandon the region. He retreated to his stronghold on Mount Khustup in the Ghapan district, vowing to resist the Bolshevik-Turkish alignment. On August 25, 1920, Nzhdeh was proclaimed Sparapet (Supreme Commander) by his partisans in the village of Kavart.

Exploiting the local population's resentment toward Bolshevik requisitions and the murder of their leaders, Nzhdeh launched a general rebellion on October 10. His irregulars utilized explosive-filled barrels rolled down mountain slopes and their intimate knowledge of the terrain to devastate Soviet columns.

=== Confrontation in Goris ===
General Nikifor Nesterovskii and later General Pyotr Kuryshko led massive operations to liquidate the rebellion. However, in a series of engagements during November 1920, Nzhdeh's forces routed the Red Army’s 28th Division. By November 22, 1920, Nzhdeh’s forces triumphantly re-entered Goris, expelling the Red Army from Zangezur.

The sovietization of the central Armenian government in Yerevan occurred on December 2, 1920. Zangezur, however, remained independent under Nzhdeh's control, declaring itself "Autonomous Siunik." Following the failed February Uprising of 1921 in Yerevan, thousands of Armenian soldiers, intellectuals, and political leaders fled to Zangezur to continue the resistance.

=== Declaration of Mountainous Armenia ===
On April 26, 1921, at a congress held in Tatev, the Republic of Mountainous Armenia was proclaimed. Nzhdeh served as the supreme military commander, while Simon Vratsian headed the civil administration. The republic continued to demand that Zangezur remain an integral part of Armenia, citing the declaration made by Soviet Azerbaijan's leader, Nariman Narimanov, on November 30, 1920, which had briefly ceded the disputed regions to Armenia as a "fraternal gesture".

The conflict in Zangezur experienced a significant escalation in late 1920. Rebel forces utilized the mountainous terrain and guerrilla tactics to outmaneuver the Red Army, and Soviet operations were severely hampered by the onset of winter. As a result, Soviet regiments were drastically depleted; for instance, regiments of the 84th Rifle Brigade numbered only 150 to 250 bayonets each. Specifically, the 248th Regiment fielded 188 bayonets, 30 machine gunners, 9 cavalrymen, and 29 command staff, while the 249th Rifle Regiment consisted of 118 bayonets, 20 machine gunners, 16 telephone operators, and 14 command staff. Non-combat losses were high, with disease-related fatalities exceeding combat wounds. On December 25, 1920, a congress convened by Nzhdeh at the Tatev Monastery refused to recognize the Sovietization of Armenia and declared Zangezur an autonomous republic.

== War ==
=== Forces ===
==== Red Army ====
Across the campaign, estimates of Bolshevik and Soviet-aligned forces attacking Zangezur vary depending on the operational phase and front. According to Hrant Simonyan, the Bolshevik force deployed across all axes on the eve of the decisive mid-June 1921 offensive amounted to approximately 10,000 soldiers, supported by rear units and artillery. The eastern strike element, designated as the Karabakh-Zangezur group under the 1st Caucasian Corps, comprised 5,175 bayonets, 400 sabres, 100 machine guns, 12 artillery pieces, and 7 aircraft. Advancing from the west, the Yerevan Group was split into three operational columns:

- The first column consisted of 1,128 infantrymen and 27 machine guns, drawing from the 1st, 2nd, and 3rd Rifle Regiments of the Armenian Red Army alongside the "Red Battalion".
- The second column assembled 2,150 combined infantry and cavalry troops, 80 machine guns, and 6 artillery pieces.
- The third column fielded 1,208 troops, 45 machine guns, and several artillery pieces.

Earlier in the campaign, Red Army field formations operating in the rugged terrain had suffered severe attrition. During late 1920, the 84th Rifle Brigade was reduced to between 150 and 250 bayonets per regiment; the 248th Regiment fielded only 188 bayonets, while the 249th Regiment was reduced to 118 bayonets.

Official records of the People's Commissariat for Military Affairs (NKVM) documented the overall operational strength assigned to the Separate Caucasian Army during the 1921 counter-insurgency campaign in the region, peaking in April at 19,500 troops (35 infantry battalions and 10 cavalry squadrons):

- April 1921: 19,500 (35 infantry battalions, 10 cavalry squadrons) (highest point)
- May 1921: 10,300 (28 infantry battalions)
- June 1921: 8,500 (23 infantry battalions)
- July 1921: 8,000 (21 infantry battalions)

==== Rebel ====
The forces of the Republic of Mountainous Armenia under Garegin Nzhdeh are estimated to have fielded between 9,100 and 12,000 fighters across the various defensive sectors. Soviet military assessments compiled for April 1921 recorded 9,170 combatants (6,800 infantry and 2,370 cavalry) equipped with 96 machine guns and more than 10 artillery pieces. By the eve of the Soviet mid-June offensive, Simonyan estimates that rebel strength had expanded to around 12,000 men under arms, supported by 16 artillery pieces and over 100 machine guns.

Sector garrisons and regional detachments included:

- The main body of the Zangezur Western Front, which held its sector with 330 soldiers.
- The Meghri sector, garrisoned by 2,500 fighters (including 600 cavalry), 2 mountain guns, and 20 machine guns.
- The Daralagyaz region, defended by approximately 3,000 regular infantry and 500 cavalry.
- The Sisian region, manned by 1,500 regular troops equipped with 24 machine guns.

The operational statistical returns of the NKVM tracked the total rebel combatant numbers in the sector month-by-month throughout 1921, showing a peak of 9,500 in April before a steady collapse following the July retreat across the Araxes River:

- April 1921: 9,500 (25 bands) (highest point)
- May 1921: 8,100 (21 bands)
- June 1921: 7,000 (17 bands)
- July 1921: 6,000 (15 bands)

=== Timeline ===
By the spring of 1921, Soviet estimates placed the Armed Forces of Mountainous Armenia at around 9,170 total fighters (6,800 infantry and 2,370 cavalry). They were equipped with 96 machine guns and over 10 artillery guns. The main rebel headquarters was situated south of Goris, with a contingent of approximately 700 men stationed under Nzhdeh at Dortpi. On April 21, 1921, a second congress at Tatev proclaimed the "Republic of Mountainous Armenia."

While negotiations between Bolshevik Armenia and the rebel forces were ongoing in May 1921, the Red Army command, following a Kavburo decision, prepared an offensive set for June 25, 1921, choosing to rely primarily on Armenian units of the Red Army. The attempt to peacefully integrate Zangezur had stalled in May, and anti-Bolshevik resolve was further fueled when former representatives of Georgia, Armenia, Azerbaijan, and Dagestan signed an agreement in Paris on June 10, 1921, pledging joint struggle against the Bolsheviks. On June 13, the Soviet Armenian government prepared an appeal signed by Alexander Miasnikian and members of the government to the “Authorities of Zangezur”, which was printed as a leaflet for propaganda purposes.

==== Initial Armenian offensive ====
As the Soviet presence consolidated, the military situation grew increasingly volatile. Around this time, roughly 3,000 Azerbaijani forces infiltrated the borders of Mountainous Armenia under the guise of nomads near Minkend, further threatening Syunik's defense lines. On June 5–6, 1921, Soviet forces launched a major offensive on the Ordubad–Genvaz front. By the evening of June 6, Syunik's popular companies repulsed the attack, inflicting heavy casualties and chasing the retreating forces back to Ordubad, which Colonel Ohanjanian noted was a significant morale boost for the defenders. Learning of Bolshevik preparations, rebel forces, fortified on the left bank of the Arpacha River on the impregnable heights of Ghushchi–Genvaz, launched an attack. The 330 soldiers constituted the bulk of the troops of the Zanzezur Western Front. Commanded by Yaponin (Yovhannes Paronian), the attack was sudden and pushed through the Vorotan mountain pass. On the night of June 15–16, the attack had succeeded; the rebels quickly pushed out Armenian Red Army troops and captured the entire Daralagyaz District.

On June 16, commander Kuro Tarkhanian/Tarkhanov sent a telegram to Nzhdeh, who was in Kapan, reporting that rebel horsemen had taken 3 cannons, ammunition, and 170 prisoners (including three battalion commanders) from the Soviets, alongside 4 mountain cannons. Tarkhanian noted that the enemy was retreating in terror and that their Daralagyaz units were effectively beaten. On June 17, rebel forces took an additional 700 Soviet troops prisoner and captured several machine guns. Aram Simonyan notes that this surprise attack placed the Soviets in a "difficult position," decisively beating their units in the first three days and giving the rebels the advantage. Capturing the Arpa bridge threatened other Soviet units from the rear, causing the Daralagyaz garrison—the first regiment of the Soviet Armenian brigade—to collapse and cease operations after suffering heavy casualties and encirclement.

The second Soviet Armenian brigade also began a disorderly retreat under heavy rebel attacks. Although brigade commanders briefly formed a short-lived battle order, increasing pressure forced them to retreat once more. This retreat allowed the rebel forces in Zangezur to deploy their cavalry, which passed behind the third Soviet Armenian brigade. To avoid encirclement, the regiment retreated to the eastern heights of Aynadzor (Aghavnadzor), where they were continually attacked by Zangezur rebels. The second and third battalions evaded capture by retreating across the Arpa bridge to Norashen, whereas the first battalion was separated under pressure, abandoned its positions on Aynadzor’s heights, and retreated toward Gharanlugh (Martuni).

Many local villagers left Daralagyaz alongside the retreating Red Army units. Three to four days after Daralagyaz was captured, Arshak Hovhannisyan, Yeprem Sargsyan, and Garnik Shahinyan arrived in Keshishkend and demanded—on Nzhdeh's behalf—that Yapon launch an offensive to capture Nor Bayazet (Gavar). Yapon firmly refused the proposal, stating that they could not cross the Selim Pass to capture Nor Bayazet and that his troops were demoralized and waiting for an opportunity to desert to their nearby homes. Soviet reports also noted demoralization within the rebel forces. To stop the rebel advance, the Red Army command increased pressure along the borders of Arevik, Kapan, and Goris, forcing Nzhdeh to redeploy a portion of the Syunik troops from Daralagyaz to defend those borders.

On June 18, Nzhdeh led a light cavalry unit from Kapan through the Sovietized, Turkic-populated region of Bargushat to disperse Red Army forces concentrated on the right bank of the Vorotan River. The local population, who had been under Bolshevik authority for a year, welcomed the troops with food and pledged submission, while the district militia fled toward Khanlygh. Nzhdeh appointed a Turkic commissar over the villages before arriving in Goris. On the same day, Alexander Miasnikian, Chairman of the Council of People's Commissars of Armenia, issued an appeal blaming the Zangezur authorities for the renewed bloodshed, stating that while the Soviets did not seek the conflict, an upcoming Red Army offensive would liberate Daralagyaz and the entirety of Zangezur.

In an article titled “The New Adventure”, the Sovetakan Hayastan (Խորհրդային Հայաստան) newspaper wrote: “The blow against the people has been struck. The Soviet government of Armenia made utmost efforts to resolve the Zangezur issue without bloodshed. On the 13th, Comrade Karinyan, a representative of our government, once again set out for Daralagyaz with a peace proposal; the ‘saviors’ of Zangezur had been forewarned of this proposal, yet they... prefer war to peace..."

==== Soviet counteroffensive ====
Learning of this, Miasnikian summoned them to his office and sternly warned them against falling into extremes or becoming overly focused on the administrative, judicial, and punitive aspects of the matter. Hayk Baghdasaryan, a tribunal member present at the meeting, later noted that the president of the republic instructed them to prioritize political influence to stop the panic and boost the morale and combat spirit of the troops. Specifically, Miasnikian stated that the mere presence of the military revolutionary tribunal at the front, alongside other military and political steps, would help quickly restore order and discipline in the units. He added that it was necessary to talk with commanders and soldiers to clarify the reasons behind the retreat before initiating any legal proceedings.

Despite these warnings and concerns, the military-revolutionary tribunal focused heavily on punitive measures upon arriving at the front, leading to unjustified punishments and numerous casualties. Nevertheless, with the tribunal's assistance, Red Army commanders managed to re-establish order within their units and regroup their forces.

Around the same time, the 20th Cavalry Regiment of the Armenian Red Army arrived to reinforce them, entering combat immediately. After reorganizing their battle lines, Red Army units launched several counterattacks, slowing the momentum of the Zangezur forces and halting their advance near the villages of Rind and Arpa. Even so, the defeat of the Red Army troops remained clear.

Throughout six days of intense and bloody fighting from June 15 to 21, the First Armenian Brigade fell back roughly 80 kilometers. Daralagyaz came completely under the control of the Zangezur forces, who captured 900 soldiers and commanders—representing a third of the Soviet troops in the area—along with 20 machine guns and substantial amounts of food, textiles, and ammunition. However, internal friction arose when troops demanded to continue advancing, but command opposed it, arguing that while taking Yerevan was feasible, holding it for more than five days would be difficult. This disagreement between the soldiers and high command threatened to widen.

The command recognized that the operational plan to surround and completely destroy the First Armenian Red Brigade had ultimately failed. Having also suffered heavy casualties during the week of fighting, Nzhdeh decided to call off the planned push toward the Ararat Plain and Yerevan. In Daralagyaz, several prominent Communists were arrested and sentenced, while key figures from the local Soviet bodies and district committee were executed by firing squad following brief interrogations.

Simonyan notes that the attack on Daralagyaz by the Zangezur forces drew mixed reactions across Soviet Armenia. Many demanded that the government take harsh action to crush the Zangezur uprising. Rallies and protest meetings took place across Yerevan and the republic, where participants condemned the action by "Dashnak agents of imperialism" and pledged full support to the Red Army to defeat the counter-revolution. However, most of the population remained in uncertain anticipation of future events.

On the evening of June 18, 1921, a major rally chaired by Miasnikian was held at the Stepan Shahumyan Workers’ Club regarding the new Dashnak venture in Zangezur. Askanaz Mravyan opened the meeting, followed by Miasnikian's address. Miasnikian pointed out that the population had inherited severe economic ruin from the civil war, noting that war is a disaster primarily affecting the working peasantry, not only because it removes productive labor from work, but also because it severely damages local infrastructure and disrupts constructive national work. The Zangezur uprising thus required precautionary measures to prevent further complications.

He acknowledged that these measures were often misunderstood by the country's intelligentsia, many of whom feared it signaled a permanent government policy against local Armenians. Miasnikian urged party activists to clear up these misconceptions, stressing that the political struggle against the Dashnaktsutyun did not justify repression or persecution against the Armenian intelligentsia. He reaffirmed that while remaining resolute against actual enemies of Soviet Armenia, the government's supportive stance toward peaceful workers and the intelligentsia would remain unchanged and strictly enforced.

Miasnikian also mentioned that the Soviet Armenian government had issued an amnesty decree and sent a delegation to Zangezur seeking a peaceful resolution so workers could return to constructive labor. He noted that while Soviet Armenia had reached agreements with neighboring Soviet republics and opened trade with Persia, the Dashnaks continued to disrupt these efforts. Affirming his confidence in victory, he declared that the amnesty decree would stay in place and announced that Nagorno-Karabakh would soon be incorporated into Soviet Armenia—an outcome the Dashnaktsutyun had failed to achieve over three years despite significant loss of life.

In his speech, Avis Nurijanyan emphasized that leniency had ended and that every peasant, worker, and Red Army soldier had to recognize those advancing from Zangezur as enemies of the working populace. Artashes Karinyan then updated the assembly on the delegation sent to Zangezur, outlining the reasons behind the Zangezur government's refusal to reach a peaceful agreement. Taking the floor, People's Commissar for Internal Affairs Poghos Makintsyan stated that only the working class genuinely desired peace, noting that the actions of the Zangezur Dashnaks were absurd and reckless. He emphasized that waging war against Soviet Armenia was impossible given the strength of Soviet rule across Russia and Transcaucasia, and that fighting Soviet Armenia was equivalent to fighting Russia itself.

Speaking for the Socialist-Revolutionary internationalists, Grigor Chubaryan asserted that the Dashnaks, who had surrendered power to the Communists the previous December, were now betraying the public interest and needed to be decisively defeated. Ultimately, the assembly unanimously adopted a resolution drafted by Drastamat Ter-Simonyan, asserting that the Zangezur government refused peaceful terms to keep the peasantry primed for an uprising, backed by Entente forces seeking to spark a civil war. The resolution condemned the Zangezur "Mauserists," urged the local peasantry to expel them and unite with Soviet Armenia, and concluded with cheers for Soviet Armenia, along with its integral parts of Zangezur and Karabakh.

Similar rallies were held across Alexandrapol, Gharakilisa, Novo-Bayazid, Kotayk, and other regions. For instance, the Dilijan District Committee of the Communist Party sent an urgent telegram on June 21 to Miasnikian and Central Committee Secretary Sergei Lukashin in Yerevan. The message declared that after hearing reports on the recent Zangezur events, the local workers, peasants, and citizens recognized the Soviet government as their true defender. Denouncing the Zangezur attack as a stab in the back during peak agricultural field work, they expressed full readiness to take up arms, fight counter-revolutionaries, and settle scores with their enemies to defend the Soviet regime.

Denouncing the Dashnaktsutyun as the "evil spirit of the Armenian people" that had dragged the population back into destruction, the newspaper Sovetakan Hayastan claimed full public backing for the Soviet regime. It argued that the peasantry's political loyalty had shifted decisively, adding that the government would grant them wide opportunities for development provided they consistently defended the regime against Zangezur's encroachments and eliminated Dashnak forces. Addressing the intelligentsia, the publication stated that aligning with the Soviet government was their only viable path.

The newspaper prompted readers to consider the consequences if Zangezur achieved independence, warning that an independent Zangezur would act as a gateway for Western imperialist intrusion.

With Soviet authority established across the rest of the Caucasus, Simonyan notes that Soviet Armenians viewed Zangezur's holdout as temporary. The capture of Daralagyaz gave the Soviet government a pretext to abandon peaceful efforts and take Zangezur by military force, a shift Simonyan regards as unjustified. While June 15–17 marked a peak in military success for Mountainous Armenia in Daralagyaz, these gains were short-lived, as holding the captured region quickly proved impractical immediately following its fall.

According to Nzhdeh, complications arose when Kuro, acting without Nzhdeh's knowledge, integrated a large contingent of armed Soviet prisoners into the Yerevan units to fight, while Kuro himself and his staff unexpectedly departed Daralagyaz for the Russian village of Bazarchay in Sisian, creating a distance of 50–60 versts (53.34 to 64.01 kilometers (or 175,000 to 210,000 feet) from the front line.

The insertion of embedded Red Army personnel into Dashnak ranks heavily influenced the trajectory of the campaign, with every soldier functioning as either an open or covert agitator. As previously noted, Anatoly Gekker and Miasnikian had already formulated an initial operational blueprint to seize Zangezur by mid-May. Building on this foundation, during the June 20 incidents in Daralagyaz, the Caucasian Army command directed its headquarters to finalize the operational plan for Zangezur's capture.

In accordance with this strategy, 11th Red Army commander Mikhail Velikanov directed Russian Red Army forces to deploy and put down the offensive. The directive mandated a synchronized, full-scale assault on Zangezur across all fronts through two designated operational formations: the Yerevan group and the Karabakh-Zangezur group. The Karabakh-Zangezur force incorporated the Separate Caucasian Army's 1st Corps alongside additional units, led jointly by Corps Commander Alexander Todorsky as group commander and I. Sviridov as commissar.

Comprising 5,175 infantry troops, 400 cavalrymen, 100 machine guns, 12 artillery pieces, and 7 aircraft, the Karabakh-Zangezur force was assigned to strike Zangezur simultaneously from the north, east, and southeast. Prior to receiving direct engagement orders, this force split into two distinct columns. The first was tasked with seizing the Khudafarin Bridge by June 30 to cut off any retreat paths toward Persia for the insurgents.

The second column was ordered to assault and take Goris by July 1, subsequently crossing the Vorotan River, hunting down Garegin Nzhdeh’s units, and securing the Kapan mines. Given the critical nature of this column's objectives, it was bolstered by local communists and sympathizers who had previously escaped the region for Nagorno-Karabakh and neighboring Azerbaijani zones. For example, the column absorbed an Aghdam-based unit established in mid-April with support from Shushi District Party Committee members and 84th Brigade commander G. Semyonov. Starting with roughly 100 personnel, the unit eventually doubled in size. Because its ranks were filled mostly with Goris natives, Nikolay Hayryan—a local communist originating from Karashen in the Goris area—was placed in command. Following a multi-day stop in Shushi to gather weapons and gear, the detachment was assigned to N. Cholov's 246th Regiment of the First Caucasian Corps.

Near the end of April, the unit marched from Shushi to the Goris perimeter, establishing positions close to Safyan, an Azerbaijani settlement situated on the Hakari River's left bank. From there, the unit leader immediately opened channels with Qubadli's Azerbaijani authorities as well as a separate local communist unit stationed there under Yeghia Ghazaryan—a faction that featured Qubadli communists including Isa Tairov, Savalan Shirinov, Murtuz Aliyev, and others. Furthermore, the detachment commander coordinated with Ojakquli Musayev, who led the Kurdish communist unit.

After spending upwards of two months stationed along the Goris frontier, numerous members of Hayryan’s unit successfully penetrated local villages to evaluate civilian sentiment, public attitudes toward the administration, and views on the Red Army, while simultaneously mapping out the armaments, troop strengths, and deployment sites of local Zangezur military units.

Meanwhile, the Yerevan group was tasked with striking Zangezur from the southwest and west, initiating hostilities ahead of the main Karabakh-Zangezur advance.. This preliminary push was designed to draw local attention away from the primary invasion axis. Under this design, Nzhdeh would be forced to pull troops away from the eastern front toward Daralagyaz to counter the Yerevan group's advance, thereby thinning Zangezur's eastern defenses and easing the Red Army's entry into the territory from Azerbaijan.

The Yerevan troop grouping was divided into three distinct columns. Comprising 1,128 infantrymen, 27 machine guns, and 2 armored vehicles, the first task force included the Armenian Red Army's 1st, 2nd, and 3rd Rifle Regiments, as well as the "Red Battalion" formed by Turks from Nakhichevan and Vedi. Its objective was to advance along the Vedi–Daralagyaz–Sisian–Goris route, rendezvous in Goris with the 1st Caucasian Corps units entering from Karabakh, and proceed together toward Kapan.

The second column consisted of the 180th and 4th infantry regiments, the 1st cavalry regiment, a howitzer battery, and the 9th mountain battery. With a strength of 2,150 infantry and cavalry troops, 80 machine guns, and 6 artillery pieces, its mission was to press along the Nakhichevan–Bichenek–Sisian axis, link up with the first column near Sisian, and jointly advance toward Goris.

The third column included the 177th and 178th rifle regiments and the 3rd Armenian battery, totaling 1,208 soldiers, 45 machine guns, and several artillery pieces. Its assignment was to launch an offensive along the Nakhichevan–Ordubad–Meghri line, swiftly cut off the routes from Genvaz to Persia, prevent retreating forces from crossing the Aras River, and encircle and destroy them.

Additionally, another unit stationed at Karanlugh (Martuni)—consisting of a company from the 20th Cavalry Regiment and a battalion from the 3rd Infantry Regiment that had retreated from Aynadzor (Aghavnadzor) on June 17—was ordered to attack Zangezur. Moving down through the Selim Pass to Hasankend (Shatin), this force was to march through Daralagyaz and join the Yerevan grouping's first column.

Altogether, Bolshevik forces attacking Zangezur from both directions, including support units and artillery, totaled 10,000 troops. By mid-June, rebel forces comprised regular local units, army units that had fled after the defeat of the February Uprising, armed groups of Western Armenians (primarily from Sasun and Mush) who had led the February revolt, and local village militia.

The regular units were the most combat-ready, led by experienced officers and relatively well-equipped with weapons and ammunition. Conversely, the army units that had retreated to Zangezur after the February Uprising were worn down from continuous combat. While the fighters from Ottoman Armenia were battle-hardened and loyal to the Goris government, their strength was severely depleted by the difficult retreat from Yerevan in April, and they were disheartened by a cold reception from local Zangezur officials.

Disillusionment grew among these Ottoman-Armenian soldiers, leading many to conclude that restoring the former regime was unrealistic and that further resistance to the Soviet military was futile. Similarly, many villagers in the militia lost the desire to fight and were ready to defect to the Red Army when given the chance.

Along the Karabakh-Zangezur front, fighters had previously built defensive structures on key heights near border villages like Kornidzor, Darakyand, Tegh, Khnadzakh, Bayandur, Khoznavar, Verishen, and Burun. Expecting the Red Army's primary strike to come from Zabukh, the command concentrated roughly 3,000 troops, 11 artillery pieces, and 27 machine guns to face the 1st Corps of the Separate Caucasian Army.

On the Sharur-Daralagyaz, Sisian, and Ordubad fronts, rebel forces opposing the Red Army totaled 7,100 infantry, 1,600 cavalry, 16 artillery pieces, and over 50 machine guns. According to Armenian Army records from June 6, Nzhdeh's regular forces in Meghri numbered 2,500 troops (including 600 cavalry), equipped with two mountain guns and 20 machine guns, under the command of Smbat, Dali, Kyurd Ghazo, and Mushegh Avetisyan. While no regular units were stationed at the Kajaran plants or across Kapan generally, the sector was defended by two mountain guns and 14 machine guns under Gerasim Atajanyan.

In the Daralagyaz region, the number of regular troops was approximately 3,000. In addition to these, Yapon’s detachment included 500 horsemen. The region possessed one artillery piece and 28 machine guns. The commanders there were Yapon, Kuro, and the Kuban Colonel Korolkov. In the Sisian region, the number of regular soldiers was 1,500, with 24 machine guns. The commanders were Martiros from Bashgarni and Mushegh from Sasun. Thus, in Mountainous Armenia, there were around 12,000 men under arms, along with 16 artillery pieces and more than 100 machine guns.

Toward the end of June 1921, the Red Army launched the multi-direction counter-offensive. The Soviet offensive towards Zangezur began on the 20th; Velikanov's group advanced south from Novo-Bayazet toward the Selim Pass, while other units advanced from Vedi and Norashen toward Chinakhchi and Keshishkend. That day, Miasnikian (Chairman of the Council of People's Commissars and People's Commissar for Military Affairs of Soviet Armenia) along with Mikhail Velikanov (commander of the Yerevan military group) issued a formal order addressed to all Red Army soldiers, commanders, and commissars. The order reiterated that while the Soviet Armenian government originally sought a peaceful resolution regarding Zangezur, the situation had shifted fundamentally due to Dashnak attacks on Soviet forces in Daralagyaz. The document framed these attacks as an attempt to overthrow Soviet authority in Armenia and the broader Caucasus, calling upon the troops to return to the battlefield. Addressing the military personnel directly, Miasnikian and Velikanov urged the Red Army soldiers to uphold their reputation through valor, reassuring them that the working population stood behind them and would support their efforts with necessary logistics and backing from the rear.

Furthermore, the order instructed fighters and commanders, upon entering the territory of Zangezur, to treat the region's peasantry with care and consideration, to refrain from harming the civilian population, and to maintain law and order in the mountainous region. The order issued to the troops by Miasnikian and Velikanov concluded with the call: “Forward to Zangezur!” The order was primarily intended to boost the morale and combat spirit of the troops advancing toward Zangezur. It was read out in all military units of the Yerevan military group that were launching the offensive on Zangezur. Simonyan writes that at rallies and meetings, soldiers and commanders vowed to display bravery on the battlefield and to spare no effort—even at the cost of their lives—to unite Zangezur with the motherland, Armenia.

Both Nzhdeh and his comrades-in-arms, and Miasnikian and his government, sought to unite Zangezur with the motherland; yet, under the banner of that very unification, a new conflict was erupting. The first units to advance against Zangezur were those of the First Column of the Yerevan troop grouping, on June 22.

Having previously secured the Kyomurlu–Elpin–Chiva–Verin Tandzik frontline in Daralagyaz, units of the First Armenian Brigade launched an offensive toward Keshishkend (Yeghegnadzor)—the center of Daralagyaz—as well as the villages of Ghurdghulagh (Boloraberd), Yengija (Gandzak), and Salli. On the first day of the offensive, Red Army troops achieved success. Nzhdeh’s units offered only sporadic resistance before retreating. That day, the Bolsheviks captured the Daralagyaz region’s villages of Amaghu, Chiva, and Arpa.

The inclusion of several hundred captured Red Army soldiers within the Araratian forces—which were retreating toward Zangezur under Kuro's command—had negative consequences. As previously noted, these soldiers completely undermined the combat effectiveness of the Araratian forces from within through their Bolshevik propaganda. Consequently, when a Soviet unit launched an attack on the Araratian forces from the south of Daralagyaz, approximately 3,000 soldiers and officers—with the exception of Khnko and Mukuch’s cavalry—surrendered to the attackers along with their weapons. The defection of such a large force to the Bolshevik side left the front line exposed.

The victory achieved by the Red Army forces on the first day of their offensive compelled the Goris government to attempt to secure a ceasefire with them. Faced with a dire situation—characterized by the rapid retreat of its troops—the government had no other choice. On June 22, an extraordinary session of the Mountainous Armenia government was held; Nzhdeh reported on the situation at the front and proposed initiating negotiations with the Yerevan government. Garnik Shahinyan was appointed as the envoy, with Aram Ter-Harutyunyan serving as his assistant. Simonyan describes the request as having happened “far too late” as the “the war machine set in motion by the Bolsheviks would no longer be halted.”

At dawn on June 23, units of the Armenian Red Army resumed their offensive. The Zangezur forces, offering only weak resistance, retreated once again. By the evening of the same day, Red Army troops had entered the villages of Keshishkend (Yeghegnadzor), Gandzak, Bashkend (Vernashen), Ghoytur (Getap), and Ortakend (Gladzor) (though Gevorgyan writes the retreat from Keshishend happened on June 20). During the retreat from Keshishkend, internal subversion and propaganda significantly weakened the Armenian lines. Soldiers of the Yerevan military unit refused to retreat and dispersed, while the Sevan battalion under Commander Aghabek defected directly to the Red Army. In a dispatch from the mines (“Hanker”) dated June 26, Nzhdeh acknowledged that internal political division, combined with acute shortages of food and ammunition, threatened their resistance, though he remained determined to fight on. In Keshishend, Red Army soldiers captured approximately 1,000 fighters from the Army of Mountainous Armenia—including 10 officers—and seized machine guns, rifles, and a large quantity of ammunition.

On June 23, other units of the First Brigade advanced further and captured the villages of Malishka and Salli. The Zangezur forces retreated toward the villages of Genvaz and Herher. Simultaneously, a battalion of the Armenian 3rd Regiment and a cavalry company of the 20th Cavalry Regiment descended into Daralagyaz from Gharanlugh (Martuni) via the Selim Pass and gorge, joining the First Brigade's units in the village of Hasankend (Shatin).

On the morning of June 25, a radio message sent from Norashen to Alexander Miasnikian described widespread disintegration in the enemy's ranks, attributed largely to captured Red Army soldiers and local villagers who had been living under Dashnak control. The communication noted that around 2,000 prisoners had been taken, with entire armed formations defecting alongside their equipment—including an artillery battery complete with its command staff and communications gear. Additionally, a signal company defected and established contact with Ghoytur following the capture of Keshishkend, where the artillery depot and its supplies were secured intact. The report also highlighted that Aghabeg's 400-strong cavalry unit was negotiating surrender terms, while local populations remained in place to warmly welcome advancing forces.

On June 24, following the Bolsheviks' capture of the villages of Herher and Genvaz, Yapon informed the command of the Soviet troops in Daralagyaz that a representative from the Goris government had arrived with a proposal to resume negotiations. The meeting between the delegate from Goris and representatives of the Armenian Red Army took place in Bash-Norashen. Garnik Shahinyan brought an official appeal from the government of Mountainous Armenia—signed by Deputy Prime Minister Arshak Hovhannisyan—addressed to the government of Soviet Armenia:

Regardless of the recent insurgent movements of the peasantry in Daralagyaz, and taking into account the vital interests of the working Armenians, the Government of Mountainous Armenia is sending Comrade Garnik Shahinyan for the second time to receive the official proposal of Soviet Armenia made to us through Comrade Karinyan. Taking advantage of this opportunity, the Government of Mountainous Armenia wishes to believe that, just as itself, the Government of Soviet Armenia—standing on the viewpoint of protecting the freedom and existence of the remnants of the suffering and hard-pressed Armenian masses—will spare no effort to do everything that will lead to a successful resolution of our mutual relations and will leave no room for the future historian to condemn, in the pages of Armenian history, a policy inconsistent with the interests of our people.

Upon receiving the proposal, the Soviet side responded that it no longer placed any faith in the offer from Goris, primarily for the following reasons: a) the negotiations at Qalajugh had failed due to the Mountainous Armenia’s government’s fault; b) by proposing new negotiations, the Zangezur’s forces sought to buy time and reorganize their forces at the front; c) while putting forward the proposal to negotiate, Zangezur military detachments had—on that very day—launched an offensive on the Meghri front (in the direction of Ordubad) against the third column of the Yerevan Grouping, which had not yet managed to reach the borders of Meghri.

While negotiations were underway in Bash-Norashen, the Armenian authorities were taking necessary measures to strengthen the army's rear. It had become known that the intelligence services of Simon Vratsian and Nzhdeh were doing all possible to gather information on Red Army troops. Moreover, during that period—late June—Vratsyan urged the refugees from Yerevan who had gathered in Tabriz and were fit for combat to return to Zangezur and join Nzhdeh, yet his appeals went unanswered. Instead, more than 4,000 refugees had already returned to Armenia via Julfa, and the influx continued.

It was no easy task for the government of Soviet Armenia to bring thousands of people back to a homeland where economic conditions remained extremely strained. Armenia was already crowded with orphans and refugees and the arrival of successive caravans placed a new, heavy burden on the republic’s authorities. Yet, the undertaking was noble and dedicated to the national interest, so the government resolved to repatriate every last refugee.

The representative office of Soviet Armenia in Julfa, led by Gevorg Hayrapetyan, lacked the means to receive the repatriates under adequate conditions. The Julfa-Yerevan railway had only just opened, and train service was not yet operational. Consequently, the office had to transport the repatriates—who had arrived in Julfa on foot from Tabriz, exhausted and battered by the sun after a grueling four-to-five-day journey—to Yerevan using whatever means of transport were available, paying for the costs out of the meager funds allocated by the government. In Julfa, those awaiting departure for Yerevan were temporarily accommodated in a few scattered, long-stationary railway cars and dilapidated structures. Necessary medical assistance was provided to them by two doctors and a medical assistant sent from Yerevan.

On June 26, a new, large group of refugees—led by Kero, a native of Mush, who had traveled on foot from Tabriz—crossed to the northern (Armenian side) of the Aras, and was the final caravan of the first repatriation phase from Persia to reach Yerevan. The arrivals had barely settled, and the distribution of bread had just begun, when news arrived from Yerevan stating that the Soviet side was compelled to tighten the border with Persia and temporarily halt the repatriation of refugees.

On June 27, Miasnikian sent a telegram to Hayrapetyan, asking him to announce—both in Julfa and in Persia—that the military command had temporarily closed the Persian border to prevent provocateurs from infiltrating the Soviet side following a new attack launched from Zangezur toward Daralagyaz. While noting this fact with regret, Myasnikyan simultaneously expressed the hope that, "once the Zangezur forces are crushed," all refugees would soon be permitted to return.

After closing the Persian border, Velikanov and Military Commissar Karl Karlovich Ratnek sent a telegram from Nakhichevan on June 26 to Hekker, commander of the Separate Caucasian Army, with copies to the Chairman of the Council of People's Commissars of Armenia and the Chairman of the Revolutionary Committee of Georgia. The telegram requested an immediate directive to temporarily block the travel of Persian Armenians across the Georgian and Azerbaijani borders until the Zangezur military operation concluded. The 450 refugees who had arrived in Julfa by train on June 29 were sent back to Tabriz, in accordance with a letter from Misniakian addressed to Hayrapetyan. Following Myasnikyan's letter, an order from Velikanov was also received in Julfa, instructing that no passengers be taken onto the trains for the time being.

The newspaper Sovetakan Hayastan explained that the border closure was caused by a new attack on Daralagyaz by forces from Zangezur, which completely halted the intake of remaining refugees. The publication noted that the front line could not be compromised while active fighting was underway. Additionally, officials feared that anti-Soviet forces could infiltrate Yerevan alongside civilians and launch a rear attack. Ultimately, the paper urged the Armenian refugees gathered in Tabriz to understand that their return was being directly delayed by the ongoing military hostilities.

Red Army units were advancing rapidly in Daralagyaz; on the evening of June 24, they captured the villages of Pashalu and Martiros, and on June 25 and 26, they took up advantageous positions for a subsequent offensive. In the ensuing battles, units of the First Armenian Brigade routed the Daralagyaz contingent of Mountainous Armenia and, advancing forward, recaptured the majority of the territories that had been abandoned between June 15 and 21. Red Army troops took numerous soldiers prisoner and seized a large quantity of military spoils: over 1,000 rifles, 27 machine guns, 2 cannons, 2 mortars, 150 crates of bombs, 50 crates of hand grenades, approximately 20,000 rounds of ammunition, and various other military equipment. The coordinated Soviet advance reclaimed all of Daralagyaz by June 26. Red Army intelligence reports from June 25 noted growing demoralization among Nzhdeh's forces, with local rebels increasingly refusing to fight against the Red Army.

Another thrust moved from Nakhchivan to capture Goris and cut off the rebel escape route south to Iran, supported by a detachment from Ordubad advancing on Meghri. On June 27, Nzhdeh expressed profound despair and betrayal in a letter to Vratsian, stating that he was deeply wounded by the actions of the Yerevan troops and their command. He lamented that their unspeakable betrayal dealt a blow to his pride and shattered his faith. The Red Army secured the Bichenek pass by June 28. Continuing their offensive, on June 29, Red Army units captured the villages of Jul (Artavan) and Ghushchi (Kechut). Having broken the resistance of Mountainous Armenia, they made a difficult ascent to the heights surrounding the upper reaches of the Bazarchay River and established positions there, which was already the threshold of Zangezur.

Securing the heights of Bazarchay meant that Daralagyaz had been captured. The military communiqué, issued by the headquarters of the Armenian SSR Military Commissariat, made a statement on the evening of June 27, expressing they had entered Zangezur and were advancing. Sisian lay ahead. Emerging from the underground, the Communists of Daralagyaz assisted the Red Army command in restoring the Bolshevik order in the district and in organizing the operations of the Soviet administrative bodies.

===== Soviet advance into Sisian and Genvaz =====
Fighting was still underway in Daralagyaz when the second column of the Red Army’s Yerevan Grouping moved from the city of Nakhichevan toward Zangezur. That column was tasked with ascending the Bichenek (Bichenek) mountain ridge—which separates the Nakhichevan district from Zangezur—crossing its mountain pass, fighting its way into the Sisian region, and there linking up with the first column of the Yerevan Grouping, which was advancing from Daralagyaz. By June 28, the vanguard units of the column advancing from Nakhichevan had already reached the foothills of the Bichenek mountain ridge. On the same day, near the village of Karmalinovka (Bichenek), they encountered a Zangezur detachment out on reconnaissance. After a brief skirmish, the detachment withdrew toward Mount Salvard in the Sisian district, while the Red Army troops ascended Mount Bichenek. Before them lay the panorama of Sisian.

Soviet forces seized the Bazarchay heights toward Daralagyaz and fortified their positions on Mount Bichenek from Nakhichevan. This advance derailed the Vratsian government's plans to forcefully capture Daralagyaz and resolve the complex military-political crisis in Zangezur. Simonyan notes that these plans were grounded in wishful thinking and outdated assumptions rather than a thorough, objective analysis. Ultimately, the government relied on baseless arguments regarding its own military capability and public morale while simultaneously overestimating its position and underestimating enemy strength.

Such military action brought new destruction to Daralagyaz and claimed the lives of many Armenians from both sides. Furthermore, the government of Yerevan had promised that if Zangezur joined Soviet Armenia peacefully, it would be granted autonomy, essentially preserving its statehood structures. However, the Government of Goris not only rejected that offer, but also took the offensive in Daralagyaz, thereby ruining the very idea of Zangezur's autonomy. Following the defeat of the rebel forces in Daralagyaz, the Bolsheviks advanced without pause into the territory of Zangezur, aiming to completely liquidate Mountainous Armenia. Just as Red Army units were reaching the approaches to the Sisian region, battles erupted in the Genvaz region.

On June 23, the third column of the Yerevan Grouping advanced toward Genvaz along the Nakhichevan–Ordubad–Meghri route. There, the people of Zangezur had heavily fortified their positions in advance and prepared to put up strong resistance. In addition to the companies from Mountainous Armenia, a detachment composed of refugees from Turkish Armenia was also present, commanded by Commander Mushegh Avetisyan, with Commander Ghazar Kocharyan serving as his deputy.

When Red Army units approached the borders of Genvaz, Nzhdeh’s defensive detachments—instead of holding their ground—launched a preemptive attack toward the village of Meghri on June 25 and captured a height on Mount Alangyaz. The following day, June 26, the Soviet 178th Regiment launched a counterattack, forcing the Zangezur detachments to retreat to their starting positions. By evening, the regiment had recaptured the height.

A day later, on June 27, the forces from Zangezur launched a new offensive from Genvaz toward Ordubad, but after several hours of fierce fighting, they were forced to halt the attack. Falling back under the pressure of Soviet troops, they took up defensive positions on the western slopes of Genvaz. It was evident that the Zangezur forces would not easily yield the approaches to Genvaz; they were determined to hold the area at all costs, as it served as the rear flank for Zangezur. At that moment, Genvaz was of critical importance to them because the route for a potential retreat into Persia passed through it.

For their part, the units of the Red Army’s Yerevan Grouping—advancing and descending from the heights that separate the Sisian region from Daralagyaz—suppressed the machine-gun emplacements positioned at the foothills, descended into the valley, and captured the Russian Molokan village of Bazarchay. Nzhdeh’s troops began rapidly retreating without fortifying new positions.

The rapid victory of Red Army forces in Daralagyaz and their entry into Zangezur alarmed the government in Goris and threw the leaders of the Kurdish regions neighboring Zangezur into a panic; the latter proposed to Nzhdeh that negotiations begin in the village of Mukhurturyan in Sisian—between the government of Mountainous Armenia and representatives of the Hajisamlu Kurds—regarding a joint struggle against the Bolsheviks and their advance into Zangezur and Kurdistan. (Note: ”Kurdistan” in this context refers to the Kurdistan uezd, known as “Red Kurdistan” later in the 1920s. Today, it is located about the Lachin region.) That appeal went unheeded because the Zangezur forces hastily retreated from Mukhurtur; there was not even time to consider initiating negotiations with the Kurdish chieftains.

The Kemalists fully understood that if Zangezur were to truly pass to Soviet Armenia, it would create a major headache for the Turks by severing the link between the Turks of Azerbaijan and those of Anatolia. Although high-ranking Kemalist officials did not openly voice this concern, the idea ran like a common thread through articles in Anatolian newspapers covering the fighting in Armenia.

The Constantinople-based newspaper Yerkir (Երկիր) relied on those reports in the Turkish press when it wrote that, in all likelihood, the Kemalists were providing military aid to Nzhdeh. Ankara officials immediately responded to the article in order to dispel any suspicions that might arise within the allied Russian Bolshevik government. On behalf of the Kemalist government, the commander of the Western Front, Kazim Karabekir, sent a telegram to Turkey’s diplomatic representatives in Russia, Georgia, and Azerbaijan:

"To Moscow—to Ali Fuat Pasha,
To Tiflis—to Hussameddin Bey,
To Baku—to Memduh Şevket Bey.

The report published in the July 14 issue of the Armenian newspaper 'Yerkir', which is published in Constantinople, claiming that the commander of Zangezur, Nzhdeh, persistently sought to gain support from the command of the Turkish Eastern Army, and that the Turkish authorities allegedly provided secret aid and support to the Zangezur Dashnaks, is absolutely devoid of any basis and is entirely a malicious fabrication. We categorically deny it.

Commander of the Eastern Front:
Kazim Karabekir

As Bolshevik forces were preparing to enter the Sisian region, Turkish forces from Nakhichevan launched an attack on the area's western Armenian villages, aiming to seize the territory and drive out the Armenian population before the Red Army troops could arrive. Consequently, the Armenian villages put up fierce resistance against the attacking Turkish forces until Bolshevik military units—composed of Armenians—entered Sisian from the direction of Bazarchay, and continued to advance on Goris.

Nzhdeh arrived in Sisian. During meetings in the villages, the villagers made no secret of the fact that they lacked the means to continue the fight, expressing they had little ammunition and famine was beginning to wreak havoc.

Had the fighting continued, the government of Mountainous Armenia would have been compelled to withdraw the most active elements of the population from agricultural work and keep them under arms; in other words, it would have been possible to preserve Syunik’s independence for some time longer, but at the cost of the lives of hundreds of people. Under the prevailing political circumstances, however, doing such became seemingly impossible.

Having passed through Sisian and left government member Smbat Yeghiazaryan there, Nzhdeh hurriedly returned to Kapan. It was clear to Nzhdeh that if the Syunik forces abandoned the Sisian region, the Red Army troops would easily capture the villages of the Darabas Gorge, the Tatev sub-district, and Zangezur itself. Therefore, he was rushing to Kapan to take measures to halt the Bolshevik advance, at least in that area. Thus, Nzhdeh carried out a partial mobilization in Kapan and dispatched a cavalry detachment led by Gerasim Atajanyan to Sisian to slow the advance of the Red Army units. As for him, leading a detachment of men from Kapan, he launched an attack from there on the heights of Bargushat, where Bolshevik forces—disguised as nomads—had massed to strike the rear of the Zangezur forces should they retreat from Goris toward Kapan. After dispersing these forces, he proceeded to Tatev on June 29 with several dozen soldiers from Kapan. Two days prior, units of the Second Force Group of the Yerevan contingent had launched an offensive from the direction of Mount Bichenek and entered the territory of Sisian.

Even before ascending Mount Bichanak—that is, before reaching the pass marking the boundary of the Sisian region—a detachment of Russian Molokan villagers from Sisian joined the Red Army column near Karmalinovka, a Russian Molokan village situated at the foot of the pass on the Nakhichevan side. Those villagers had previously sought refuge in the mountains to escape reprisals, and the detachment acted as a guide. Intimately familiar with the terrain, the Russian Molokans led the Red Army units along suitable routes and provided the commanders with valuable information and advice. Having crossed the Bichanak Pass, the 180th Regiment began pursuing the Zangezur detachment, which was retreating toward Mount Salvard, on the morning of June 29.

On that same day, the first and second columns of the Yerevan troop grouping launched an offensive toward the village of Angeghakot—a location of significant strategic importance situated at the junction of the highways leading from Daralagyaz to Gharakilisa and from Nakhichevan to Gharakilisa. Although Zangezur fighters had subjected the approach routes to heavy machine-gun fire from fortified positions, they were forced to surrender the village to the Red Army troops following a brief skirmish. Thus, on June 29, the units of the Yerevan grouping’s first column—advancing from Daralagyaz toward Sisian—and those of the second column—advancing from Nakhichevan toward Sisian—linked up at the village of Angeghakot.

Advancing along the foothills of Mount Salvard and overcoming the weak resistance of the retreating Zangezur detachments, Red Army troops captured the villages of Mazra (Bardzravan) and Shaghat by the evening of that day. The first and second battalions of the 4th Rifle Regiment entered Aghkend (Ashotavan), Bnunis, and Tolors without encountering resistance.

===== Soviet capture of Sisian =====
Nzhdeh’s military units remaining in Sisian—led by Tarkhanian—had concentrated on the wooded slopes of the heights east of the village of Akhlatyan and were awaiting promised reinforcements from Goris. At dawn on June 30, they were joined by a cavalry company from Kapan led by Gerasim Atajanyan. Early that same morning, their combined forces launched an attack on the village of Akhlatyan, which had been captured by the Armenian 4th Rifle Regiment. In the ensuing four-hour battle, the units led by Kuro and Gerasim were defeated and forced to retreat.

The Goris government ordered the command of the Zangezur Western Front forces to resist the advancing Red Army troops at all costs. To organize effective resistance in the Sisian region, the government took a series of urgent measures aimed at bolstering the rear of the retreating forces. Under government directives, severe punishments were meted out—particularly to Communists and their sympathizers—who were working behind the lines to facilitate a victory for Soviet forces and the defeat of the people of Zangezur. The families and close relatives of Communists were not spared from these punishments either.

However, harsh punishments could no longer save the situation, so the Zangezur authorities once again resorted to propaganda. “Reliable” rumors circulated among the population about Bolsheviks coming with axes—rumors claiming that the Extraordinary Commission (Cheka) had carried out hundreds of arrests across Armenia in connection with the events in Zangezur, and that the majority of those arrested were natives of Zangezur.

On June 27, Order No. 12 was issued, bearing the signatures of Shavarsh Amirkhanyan, Chairman of the Extraordinary Commission of Soviet Armenia, and Melik-Hovsepyan, Head of the Special Section of the Red Army of the Armenian SSR; the order refuted the circulating rumors. “It is hereby announced for general information”, the statement read, “that in connection with the events in Zangezur, only 43 people have been arrested across Armenia; of these, 8 have already been released, while an investigation is underway regarding the remaining 35.”

The capture of Sisian was underway. Emerging from the underground, the district's Communists and their sympathizers actively supported the Red Army troops advancing through the area. They infiltrated Nzhdeh’s military units, conducted reconnaissance, gathered vital intelligence for the Soviet command, and disseminated leaflets and appeals among both the villagers and the Zangezur detachments. Communist agitators who had infiltrated the ranks were undermining both the rear and the front lines. Under the influence of this propaganda, certain units of the Zangezur army refused to fight against the Red Army forces, and surrendered.

At the front, Bolshevik propaganda was particularly destructive for those Zangezur military units composed of peasants recruited from surrounding villages. Clad in greatcoats, farmers—serving as local garrison troops—would abandon their positions under various pretexts and scatter to their villages. A member of the Goris government wrote that “Bolshevik sentiment prevails among the soldiers, and it is primarily the men from Akhlatyan who are infected by it.” Another reported: “Upon hearing the order to retreat, the troops [from Zangezur] were taken by surprise; instead of retreating, they surrendered to the enemy in groups.”

The disintegration of the Zangezur forces on the western front accelerated, particularly after news arrived that the Red Army would soon launch an attack on Zangezur from the east as well—from the direction of Azerbaijan.

Mirimanyan and Yenokyan, representatives of the Red Army still stationed in Bash-Norashen, arrived in Genvaz and, through Chubaryan and Margaryan—representatives authorized by the government of Soviet Armenia—handed a written statement to Garnik Shahinyan on June 30 in Herher, to be forwarded to the government of Mountainous Armenia. It stated that the sudden attack by Nzhdeh and Yapon on the Red Army troops in Daralagyaz took place at the exact moment when the plenipotentiary representative of Soviet Armenia, with the knowledge of the government of Mountainous Armenia, was supposed to meet with the latter's representative to deliver the peace proposals of the Soviet Armenian government. The attack by the Mountainous Armenia interrupted the peace negotiations and triggered the unfolding military operations.

The ultimatum emphasized that the peasantry of Daralagyaz aligned fully with the Soviet government, noting that many had either retreated alongside Red Army troops or later celebrated those forces as liberators. Armed with this knowledge, and confident that the population of Zangezur shared identical sentiments, the government of Soviet Armenia expressed its firm resolution to quickly resolve the conflict in the area. The correspondence concluded with a formal declaration from the Soviet Armenian government, appealing to the opposing command to consider their grave responsibility to the working class, immediately lay down their weapons, and cease a senseless resistance so that the people of Zangezur could finally unite with their socialist homeland.

Upon receiving the written statement from the Soviet side, Shahinyan returned from Herher to Genvaz, where he met with the brigade’s political commissar, Yenokyan, and asked to be relieved of the duty of delivering the envelope, stating also that he refused to return to Goris altogether.

Military Commissar Yenokyan immediately contacted Yerevan via radio and informed the government of the situation. However, authorities in Yerevan did not deem it advisable to accept Shahinyan’s refusal to return to Goris, taking two factors into account: 1. A statement regarding Goris issued by the government of Soviet Armenia might, in this instance, influence the government of Mountainous Armenia and lead to a cessation of further resistance, and 2. The Dashnaks would gain an opportunity to propagate the claim that the Soviet side had used force against the Goris delegate, thereby violating basic diplomatic norms regarding his immunity.

Accordingly, the government dispatched a telegram to Genvaz, signed by Council of People's Commissars Secretary Gharabekyan, ordering the immediate recall of the Zangezur government deputies so they could render an account to their administration. The directive specified that if the deputies flatly refused to comply, Genvaz was to secure a formal, written explanation detailing the reasons for their refusal and forward those documents to Yerevan, reinforcing the demand that they must return to their government.

Based on the tone of the response received from Yerevan, Yenokyan asked Shahinyan to deliver the text of the Soviet side's statement to Goris as soon as possible. The latter was forced to comply with the instruction from Yerevan and left for Goris with his friend, Aram Ter-Harutyunyan. Reaching the village of Shaghat in Sisian, which had been captured by the Red Army soldiers the day before, they wanted to continue their journey. However, after checking them, the patrols on duty in the village led them to the regiment's military commissar, Mayer. Mayer demanded that Shahinyan show his certificate proving he was an official delegate of the Goris government and that this was confirmed by the Soviet side. The latter did not have such a document and explained that they had not provided the required certificate in Goris. Disbelieving this explanation, the military commissar ordered them to change their route, travel to Nakhichevan via the Bichenek Pass, and report to Velikanov, the head of the Nakhichevan faction of the Red Army, and the faction's military commissar.

However, Shahinyan remained adamant and flatly refused to travel to Goris. The Soviet side attached no further importance to this refusal, reasoning that Red Army units were advancing so rapidly that by the time the Mountainous Armenia delegate reached Goris, he would no longer find the Zangezur government there.

Shahinyan, nevertheless, found it convenient to send a letter from Nakhichevan to the Government of Mountainous Armenia, dated July 6, which in its content was sooner a means of escaping the dangers later expected from the Bolsheviks and a “justification before history”. He wrote that upon arriving in Daralagyaz, and then also in Nakhichevan, he became convinced that the Soviet government protected the interests of the working class, and taking up arms against it in Daralagyaz was an adventure. Condemning the gambling with the fate of the “Araratian working people,” he noted, “it is my deep conviction that it is enough to put the Armenian working people under arms, to tear them away from peaceful creative work,” one must be responsible for the “shed blood” of the people, “a Russian Soviet orientation must be pursued, because the salvation of the working people lies within it.” The armistice failed, and that opened the door to new misfortunes. Explaining why he did not want to return to Goris, he wrote: “I cannot stain my young life with the blood of my people; I no longer want to be, against my will and conviction… a participant in a cause to which I have long been opposed by my convictions.”

Meanwhile, the battles in the Sisian region were still ongoing. The Zangezur command was making great efforts to stabilize the situation in Sisian, but it was not succeeding. On June 30, a large Zangezur detachment—under the command of Melik-Yolchyan, the Minister of Internal Affairs of the Goris government—attempted to block the advance of the Red Army troops on the slopes of the mountains north of Gharakilisa, but had no success. After a brief exchange of fire, the detachment retreated toward the village of Vaghudi, which borders the Goris region.

Whether or not the rebels of Zangezur should continue to fight was a question that plagued their forces. By the end of June, Nzhdeh was already considering halting the fighting and reconciling himself to the idea of the Sovietization of Mountainous Armenia. However, there was a circumstance that ruled out this possibility: Red Army troops had been ordered to block the route from Syunik to Persia at all costs and to capture the leaders of the February Uprising and the struggle for Mountainous Armenia. Had the Soviet side left that route open and secure, resistance in Zangezur would, in all likelihood, have ceased as early as the end of June. Yet, the Bolsheviks' uncompromising stance compelled some of the armed forces in Syunik to continue the fight.

On July 1, the first and second columns of the Yerevan group launched joint operations to capture Gharakilisa, the center of Sisian. Within a few hours, Soviet troops entered the villages of Ghalajugh, Gharakilisa, and Uz. The Mountainous Armenia military units ascended the mountains of the Yayji and Darabas villages. On the same day, July 1, Nzhdeh wrote the following message from the Tatev Monastery to the Minister of the Republic of Armenia, Yeghiazaryan, and Tarkhanian, who were in Sisian:

Officially inform the commander of the Soviet military unit operating in Sisian of the following: ‘The Government of Mountainous Armenia requests that you inform us where and in what condition Garnik Shahinyan, the representative of the Government of Mountainous Armenia, is located. He carried letter No. 1437 written by the Government of Mountainous Armenia on June 24 of this year regarding peace negotiations. Our government requests to remind the Revolutionary Committee of Soviet Armenia once again that, wishing to put an end to the battles and bloodshed, we are ready to begin peace negotiations; otherwise, the full responsibility for the blood to be shed will fall upon the Revolutionary Committee of Armenia.’

Thus, the military operations of the Red Army’s Yerevan-based units in the vast Zangezur region—specifically in Sisian—effectively came to an end. Consequently, instead of receiving a reply from Tarkhanian or Yeghiazaryan regarding Shahinyan, Nzhdeh received a telegram in Tatev from Deputy Prime Minister Arshak Hovhannisyan, sent from Goris, which stated that Sisian had already been completely occupied by the Bolsheviks. Let us add that in the villages of Sisian seized by Soviet troops, local Soviet administrative bodies were immediately re-established. A portion of the population supported the newly formed revolutionary committees and provided assistance to Red Army units. A significant number of Sisian residents joined these units to participate in military operations unfolding in other parts of Zangezur.

Leaving a small detachment on the Yerablur plateau, Nzhdeh headed to Goris on July 1, where he immediately convened a meeting of the Council of Ministers. It was decided there to abandon Goris. Nzhdeh informed the commander of the Zangezur military forces of the decision and issued the following orders: a) to offer resistance to Bolshevik forces only if Turkish and Tatar forces attempted to enter Syunik alongside Russian troops; b) not to take up arms against Russian and Armenian military units. On that same day until July 2, Archbishop Nerses Melik-Tangian of Atropatene attempted to mediate a diplomatic end to the fighting, sending peace proposals and forwarding a copy of a telegram sent to Soviet Armenian leader Alexander Miasnikian to Nzhdeh to negotiate a ceasefire.

That same day, towards evening, thousands of residents of Goris spontaneously gathered in front of the government building, having come to hear “a few words from Nzhdeh”. Stepping out onto the balcony, Nzhdeh addressed his final farewell to them in roughly these terms:

“People, you are wounded, but not defeated. The enemy knows this, too, and for that very reason, he must treat you as one who has not been defeated. The enemy’s own interests also dictate that he treat you humanely. Should he be foolish enough to repeat his grim past, rest assured that once you have gathered your harvest, you will see me by your side once more.”

Under pressure from Red Army units that had entered the Darabas Gorge, the Zangezur detachments stationed there retreated toward the Pat-Pat heights. Pursuing them closely, Red Army troops engaged in combat at these heights on July 2 and defeated the main forces of the detachments. Subsequently, encountering no resistance, they captured Darabas—the last village in the Sisian area. That same evening, the village of Yayji, situated on the left slope of the Vorotan Gorge within the Goris district, was also captured. The Zangezur detachments retreated toward the villages of Tatev, Tandzatap, and Sevarants in the Goris district.

The other part of the Yerevan troop grouping, having headed toward the city of Goris, entered the Yerablur plateau situated between the Sisian and Goris districts. Establishing positions on this plateau, the units of the grouping prepared to enter the city. While the troops of the Yerevan grouping had already reached the approaches to Goris—the capital of Mountainous Armenia—from the west, the Karabakh-Zangezur grouping was simultaneously making final preparations for an attack on Mountainous Armenia from the east.

In accordance with the military operational plan for the capture of Zangezur, during the last ten days of June 1921, units of the 1st Corps of the Separate Caucasian Army—which constituted the main forces of the Karabakh-Zangezur grouping—began concentrating on the eastern approaches to Zangezur, in Kurdistan and adjacent territories. By June 25, the corps was in a state of full combat readiness.

As early as June 27, 1921, Corps Commander Todorsky had issued a special order to the troops, stating that “all of the counter-revolutionary forces of Transcaucasia” had rallied around Zangezur, “sharpening a knife against the achievements of our revolution.” At the same time, he recalled that Nzhdeh's resistance “took the lives of many heroic warriors from the ranks of the army.” Addressing the soldiers and commanders of the Red Army, Todorsky framed the battle for Zangezur as a decisive campaign against counter-revolutionary elites. He motivates his troops with the absolute certainty of victory, declaring that Zangezur will inevitably fall to the Soviets because the Red Army had “willed it”, and promises them rest in Goris and Kapan once Garegin Nzhdeh’s resistance is completely liquidated.

===== Political propaganda and Soviet advance from the East =====
On July 1, 1921, a 9-page booklet titled "The Ideological Content of the Zangezur Operation and Our Tactics" (Issue No. 3)* was published by the military-political department of the Caucasian First Corps’ headquarters, bearing the signatures of the commander of the First Caucasian Corps, Alexander Todorsky, and corps military commissar Sviridov. It was distributed to all military units of the corps on the eve of the offensive against Mountainous Armenia.

The booklet framed the Red Army's role as defending Soviet power against internal White Guard and external imperialist forces. Under the section analyzing the Zangezur operation, both the Dashnaktsutyun and Musavat parties were heavily condemned for historically inciting mutual ethnic massacres between Armenians and Muslims, with the booklet portraying "Armenian chauvinists" as perpetual aggressors. As a primary example of nationalist violence, the text cited the 1919–1920 events in Sharur:

The Sharur region—the valley of the Aras River, from the Ulukhanlu station to Nakhichevan, populated by Muslims, the flourishing storehouse of the Aras—today represents a valley of death and decaying corpses. In 1919 and 1920, part of the entire population of Sharur was subjected to massacre by the governmental troops of the Armenian Republic, while the rest were driven out to Turkey, and their property was looted by the Mauserists, who now defend Nzhdeh's ‘paternal estate’—Zangezur. Humanity knows no such barbarity.

The authors characterized Armenian territorial claims regarding Western Armenia as an "encroachment on Turkish vilayets." The booklet argued that having lost power in Armenia and Azerbaijan, Dashnaktsutyun and Musavat had united to form a counter-revolutionary front in Zangezur alongside local "chauvinists" and "Persian bandits." Consequently, the directive concluded that Zangezur had to be neutralized and brought under Soviet control.

The final section outlined 21 rules of conduct for Red Army troops during the operation. While instructing soldiers to frame local ethnic enmities through a "class struggle" lens, the command ordered troops to treat Armenians and Muslims equally without favoring either side, respect local customs, protect the "inviolability of women," and refrain from plundering civilian property or homes. Captured villages were to establish revolutionary committees (revkoms) incorporating local poor peasants and party representatives, while military units were mandated to include both Armenian and Muslim representatives from impoverished backgrounds to mitigate ethnic friction.

On July 1, 1921, a joint consultation took place at the encampment on the banks of the Hagar River between the command of the Soviet military contingent and the leaders of the Zangezur communist detachment—which had arrived with the army. On the eve of the offensive, the detachment numbered over 170 personnel. The consultation resolved that the detachment would support Red Army units through highly active operations. Following the meeting, and in accordance with the decision reached, some of the partisans—who were intimately familiar with the terrain and the local population—detached from the main group and were integrated into specific military units to serve as guides.

On the morning of July 2, Nzhdeh's government sent a telegram to Yerevan, officially informing the command of the Soviet grouping of the cessation of resistance. “Mountainous Armenia”, the dispatch stated, “ceasing military operations, trusts that the Revolutionary Committee of Soviet Armenia will fulfill all the promises made in its statement addressed to the authorities of Zangezur.” The content of the telegram was immediately relayed from Yerevan to Moscow and to the headquarters of the Transcaucasian Red Army, accompanied by the following information: “Without resistance, the enemy is pulling its forces south, toward the Persian border. This time we consider the sovietization of white Zangezur probable.”

Having previously handed over power to a body composed of locals, the government moved from Goris to Tatev. On the morning of July 2, Nzhdeh ascended the Yerablur plateau and from there proceeded to Tatev. Late in the evening of the same day, the government of Mountainous Armenia held a consultation in Tatev with Nzhdeh participating. Nzhdeh announced that the government should relocate to Hanker, and since Kapan—unlike Sisian and Goris—was firm, he would continue to lead the merciless struggle against the enemy from there.

Army units of the 1st Caucasian Corps under Alexander Todorsky mobilized from Shusha in Nagorno-Karabakh on July 2, converging with the Yerevan units to enter Goris. At dawn on July 2, 1921, the military units of the First Karabakh-Zangezur Corps of the Separate Caucasian Army launched the offensive. The group began its attack on the center toward the village of Tegh (Teg), from the left flank toward Kornidzor, and from the right flank in the direction of the villages of Khnatzakh and Khoznavar. Attacking through the center, the main forces of the Red Army troops under the command of Voyciechovsky encountered heavy fire from outpost soldiers right at the border, who, having been warned in advance, were awaiting the Soviet troops' assault. The Red Army soldiers brought out their cannons. After shelling the positions of the Zangezur defenders, the Bolshevik units entered the village of Tegh without encountering serious resistance. Several Zangezur detachments managed to withdraw from that sector and ascend toward Lake Sevan, joining their comrades positioned there.

===== Fall of Goris and Tatev =====
Units of the 107th Red Cavalry Regiment, advancing from the left, captured the village of Kornidzor with almost no resistance and then linked up with the central forces. Without pausing, they launched a swift, joint assault to enter the villages of Karashen and Khndzoresk. A portion of the Zangezur forces veered left and descended into the narrow Vararak River valley, heading toward the village of Maghanjugh. The remainder of the Zangezur forces continued a disorganized retreat from the Karashen–Khndzoresk sector toward the city of Goris. Pursuing them, the corps' units reached the heights east of the city by evening.

On the left flank of the front, the corps' 246th Regiment, commanded by Chalabov (Chalabyan), launched an attack in the direction of Khoznavar–Khnatsakh–Kachal Dagh. The residents of Zangezur had previously fortified this line—particularly the section stretching from Kachal Dagh to Mount Chalburun—by digging trenches and preparing defensive positions. Just a day earlier, the Zangezur military command had dispatched several detachments from the area of Tegh village to reinforce the defense of this line. A fierce battle ensued in which mountain artillery from both sides was put out of action. Rebel forces suffered heavy casualties in the bloody engagement, while the Soviet regiment also sustained significant losses in killed and wounded personnel.

Encountering resistance, Chalabov's regiment was forced to retreat to its starting positions by midday—the village of Sultanakend in Kurdistan. Reorganizing its ranks and receiving new reinforcements here, the regiment went on the offensive again on the evening of that same day, July 2. Members of a detachment formed from Zangezur communists came to the military unit's aid. Infiltrating the rear of the Zangezur defenders, the communist propagandists persuaded the combatants that the forces of the two sides were vastly unequal—more precisely, that Soviet forces outnumbered them four to five times—making further resistance entirely pointless, and that they should lay down their arms because the Red Army troops coming to Zangezur were liberators, not conquerors.

The armed peasants, however, did not believe this, stating that the “liberators” were coming from the direction of Azerbaijan, and that they preferred death to the “freedom” coming from there. The Bolshevik propagandists replied that although the Soviet military units were coming from the direction of Azerbaijan, this time there were no Turkish forces or “Bolshevik ax-wielders” in their ranks.

Going on the offensive once again, Chalabov's regiment defeated the Zangezur peasant detachments in fierce battles on the heights of Chalburun and Kachal Dagh.

Late in the evening, the regiment's units captured the villages of Khnatzakh, Bayandur, and Khoznavar. A portion of the defeated Zangezur forces retreated in disarray toward the town of Goris, while the armed peasants descended from the mountains overnight via various paths and dispersed to their home villages. On the evening of July 2, the main forces of the Red Army's Karabakh-Zangezur grouping, entering the valley of the Vararak River alongside members of the communist detachment, entered Goris, the center of Mountainous Armenia. Nzhdeh's rear-guard units abandoned the town and, gathering through various routes in the gorge of the Vorotan River, set a course toward Kapan. On that same day, the forces of the Red Army's Yerevan grouping had launched an attack on the center of Mountainous Armenia from the west, coming from the Yerablur plateau in the Goris region. Two hours after the town was captured by the units of Todorsky's corps, the Armenian cavalry regiment of the Yerevan grouping also entered Goris. Thus, the two groupings of Red Army troops—the Karabakh–Zangezur and the Yerevan—joined forces.

Following the unification of the First Caucasian Corps and the Yerevan grouping in Goris, the units of the latter, with the exception of the 4th Rifle and 1st Cavalry Regiments of the Armenian Red Army, came under the command of Todorsky and began operating alongside his forces. After spending the night in Goris, early in the morning on the following day, July 3, the corps' 245th regiment advanced to capture the village of Karahunj, located on the right mountain slope of the Goris-Kapan highway, and fortified itself there. The other, 370th regiment, moved south along the same highway and, passing through a place called “Tsaker”, descended into the gorge of the Vorotan River, fortifying itself in the vicinity of the village of Eyvazlar. The remnants of the defeated Zangezur forces ascended the Mazmazak plateau via the highway passing over the slopes of Mount Tas and, without stopping, retreated in the direction of the Chaizam River.

The 4th Rifle and 1st Cavalry Regiments of the Armenian Red Army had not come under the corps command's orders because, upon completing military operations in the Sisian region, they had not headed toward Goris; rather, after capturing the villages of Darabas and Yayji, they continued their offensive in the Halidzor–Tatev sector of the Goris region. On July 4, without encountering resistance, the Bolshevik forces entered the ravines separating Tatev from Halidzor, where the companies formed from locals dispersed, and the soldiers returned to their villages. Nzhdeh and his government withdrew to Kapan. On the same day, after a brief skirmish, the 4th Rifle and 1st Cavalry Regiments entered Tatev. The rebels were trapped in a pincer movement and had to retreat.

The following day, units of these same regiments captured the villages of Sevarants, Tandzatap, and Maldash in the Goris region. Reaching the area along the Maldash-Bardzravan line and capturing the village of Bardzravan, the Armenian 4th Rifle and 1st Cavalry Regiments established contact with the 372nd and 240th regiments of the Caucasian Corps, which had advanced via the slopes of Mount Tas to the Mazmazak-Chaizam sector. Zangezur proper (the Goris region) was completely captured.

Upon entering Zangezur, Red Army soldiers—alongside returning underground Bolsheviks seeking revenge—initiated illegal violence and reprisals against individuals who had participated in the region's defense or sympathized with the authorities of Mountainous Armenia. This wave of retribution claimed additional lives, reviving the nightmare experienced precisely one year prior.

To curb these acts of violence and retaliation against local residents, Miasnikian—acting as People's Commissar for Military Affairs of Soviet Armenia and member of the Military Revolutionary Council of the Separate Caucasian Army—issued a formal address on July 3, 1921, to the Soviet military units operating in Zangezur. While calling on the soldiers to fight selflessly to achieve their objectives, he urged them to treat the population with deep humaneness. Wishing the troops victory, Myasnikyan instructed the soldiers to view the Zangezur peasant as a brother and ally, to respect the personal rights, homes, and property of the locals, and to maintain strict discipline. He reminded them that the Red Army was meant to bring freedom, order, and prosperity, and exhorted every soldier to demonstrate through their helpful conduct that they were defenders of the working people.

Miasnikian continued his address by urging Red Army soldiers to remain disciplined, cautious, and resolute during operations in the mountainous terrain, emphasizing the critical importance of maintaining supply lines and communication with the rear. He exhorted the troops not to complain about campaign hardships, assuring them that patience and endurance in liberating Zangezur would earn them the backing of the country and the gratitude of future generations.

Meanwhile, on July 4, Nzhdeh arrived in Hanker and convened a consultation with members of the government. Although he insisted that there was no cause for alarm and rejected any notion of abandoning Hanker—maintaining that he intended to defeat the enemy in Kapan—the attendees expressed deep concern over the security of the funds and valuables brought from the state treasury in Yerevan. Nzhdeh ultimately consented to dispatching the currency to Meghri, where it was decided to bury 5 billion newly printed Armenian rubles underground while retaining 100 million Armenian rubles, 120 million Soviet rubles, and available gold currency to cover the needs of refugees. A commission consisting of Hambardzum Terteryan, Sergei Melik-Yolchyan, and Samson Melik-Parsadanyan of Kapan was established to oversee the transport and management of these funds.

===== Guerrilla resistance plans and arms caching =====
Following the government consultation, Garegin Nzhdeh and a small inner circle of trusted leaders determined to cache a substantial portion of their weapons and ammunition across the Kapargoght region in anticipation of potential Red Army advances into Kapan and Meghri. Anticipating the possibility of launching a guerrilla resistance from the mountains should the area fall, Nzhdeh's forces established several hidden arms caches over the course of two days, assigning specific local commanders and officers to guard each depot.

These hidden stockpiles were distributed throughout strategic mountain pass locations, forests, and village outskirts. Near the Katari factories and Gyutkum village, supplies including dynamite, hand grenades, rifles, rounds of ammunition, and machine guns were cached under the protection of trusted local defenders, including Gerasim Atajanyan and Captain Tevan. Additional caches of dynamite, artillery shells, and small arms ammunition were hidden in the forests of Chakaten, near the ruins of a monastery at the base of Mount Khustup near Vachagan village, and within Bekh village, each guarded by designated officers and former factory commanders. Further caches were secured across the region's southern gorges and villages to ensure widespread coverage for future resistance. In the Genvaz region within the Kaler gorge, mountain cannons and machine guns were concealed with their locations restricted to Select local figures, while additional machine guns and ammunition were hidden in Gudemnis, Meghri, and the Shvanidzor gorge under the oversight of local post commanders and company officers.

On July 5, Garegin Nzhdeh convened a crucial meeting in Hanker with regional representatives and frontline commanders to determine their next course of action. Although Nzhdeh initially hoped to mount a defense of Kapan, the assembly overwhelmingly favored accepting Soviet rule, driven largely by the severe threat of impending famine and the belief that the Armenian Soviet authorities in Yerevan differed from previous adversaries. When delegates voiced concerns over the possibility of Soviet Armenia ceding Syunik to Azerbaijan, Nzhdeh advised them that if Yerevan failed to protect their interests, the population could retreat to the mountains to resume the struggle once field work concluded. Ultimately, the assembly resolved to yield to the Red Army without a fight, leading to the final formal session of the Republic of Mountainous Armenia's government, which decided to evacuate Kapan and fall back toward Meghri.

Following the meeting, around 1,000 prisoners held in Kapan—the vast majority of whom were Armenian—gathered outside military headquarters to learn their fate. Addressing the crowd, Nzhdeh urged them to maintain their national identity and pride regardless of political shifts, encouraging them to remain steadfast in their heritage under the new administration. Meanwhile, Red Army forces, including the 4th Armenian Rifle Regiment and the 1st Cavalry Regiment alongside Caucasian Corps units, initiated maneuvers across the Bargushat Range to secure key positions around Hanker and consolidate control over the Kapan region.

On the left flank of the front, the Caucasian Corps' 108th Regiment advanced with instructions to pursue the retreating Zangezur forces along the Eyvazlar–Shurnukh line, capture the village of Zeyva by assault, and then pivot right along the Artsvanik–Sevkar–Barabatum line to encircle them and block their path of retreat. However, as noted by historian S. Soghomonyan, this operational plan was disrupted because the regiment's command made a tactical error in choosing its route. Deviating left from Eyvazlar, the regiment entered the Qubadli region of Azerbaijan and fortified positions in Demirchi and Dondarlu, neighboring the Kapan region. This delay proved advantageous for the retreating Zangezur detachments, allowing them time to rest and reorganize before the 108th Regiment launched an attack from Qubadli to take the villages of Zeyva and Tandzaver and press on toward Kaghnut, Yeghvard, and Agarak.

Although the regiment was positioned to strike and seize Kapan's regional center from the east, corps command committed a second tactical error by granting all units a four-day rest period. During this pause—which ultimately lasted only one to two days—pursuit of Nzhdeh's forces fell solely to the 4th Armenian Rifle Regiment and 1st Cavalry Regiment. The brief respite gave Nzhdeh enough time to redistribute his forces toward the Hanker area. By midday on July 6, the Russian 108th Regiment resumed its offensive, capturing Yeghvard, Agarak, Khdrants, and Uzhanis by evening before securing positions along the slopes of Mount Susana.

===== Fall of Kapan =====
Facing the advancing 4th Armenian Rifle Regiment and 1st Cavalry Regiment, Nzhdeh's forces attempted to fortify natural strongholds at Injabel and Karmrakar. However, on July 6, Armenian Red Army units—joined by communist detachments of local Kapan residents—attacked Injabel, preventing the retreating defenders from establishing new lines. Meeting almost no resistance, Soviet forces seized Verin Khotanan, Nerqin Khotanan, Tortni (Antarashat), Dovus, Khlatagh (Dzorastan), Arajadzor, Norashenik, and Shrvenants, closing in on Hanker.

On the morning of July 6, Nzhdeh ordered the government to evacuate Hanker immediately, as Kapan's defense lines were exposed and residents in neighboring Agarak had welcomed the Red Army with bread and salt. Panic ensued, and the government departed toward Meghri within two hours. Nzhdeh also left Hanker but headed toward Kapan's eastern front to hold the position for at least a day, giving the evacuating government and refugees time to reach safety. Meanwhile, couriers delivered Nzhdeh's final order to the Injabel front, instructing the fighters to fall back from the lines and disperse to their villages.

Nzhdeh and his companions then began their trek toward Meghri by ascending Mount Khustup. While on the mountain, he received a letter dated July 2 from Archbishop Nerses Melik-Tangyan, Prelate of the Armenian Diocese of Atropatene, alongside a copy of a telegram the Archbishop had sent to Alexander Miasnikian in Yerevan on July 1. In his message to Miasnikian, the Prelate noted that he was dispatching a courier to Nzhdeh to urge a cessation of hostilities and the start of peace negotiations. In his letter directly to Nzhdeh, Melik-Tangyan expressed his strong opposition to resolving issues through bloodshed and violence, appealing to the Mountainous Armenian leadership to accept the Soviet Armenian government's peace proposal, declare a truce, and resume the talks previously derailed by clashes in Vayots Dzor.

At this juncture, calls for a truce or negotiations were largely moot, as the rapidly advancing Soviet forces sought nothing short of unconditional surrender. Nevertheless, Nzhdeh decided to issue a formal joint response to both the Soviet Armenian government's statement and the Archbishop's mediation letter. On July 7, he drafted a message addressed to the Revolutionary Committee of Soviet Armenia.

In his July 7 letter to the Revolutionary Committee of Soviet Armenia, Garegin Nzhdeh set forth comprehensive proposals regarding internal Armenian reforms and the future status of Syunik. He emphasized that establishing lasting stability required political and economic conditions under which the population and intelligentsia could reconcile with Soviet rule rather than seek further rebellion. His key proposals for Armenia included protecting smallholder agricultural property, guaranteeing free trade, ending requisitions, supporting cooperatives, providing land to Western Armenian refugees, executing population exchanges to prevent ethnic conflicts, ensuring personal immunities and civic freedoms, abolishing the Cheka in favor of judicial authority, restoring Armenian as the official state language, and maintaining a national army with native officers.

Regarding the regional administration of Mountainous Armenia—comprising Zangezur, Nagorno-Karabakh, Vayots Dzor, and Goghtan—Nzhdeh urged that it remain an autonomous, indivisible part of Armenia governed by locally elected bodies. He argued against disarming the local populace or stationing outside forces in the region, proposing instead a local militia system backed by central supplies. Furthermore, he insisted that Turkish refugees not be resettled on local scarce lands, that nomadic seasonal movements be regulated and unarmed, and that disreputable communist cadres be excluded from regional governance. Concluding his message, Nzhdeh warned that military entry did not equate to conquering a people's desire for freedom, cautioning the authorities to satisfy these basic demands so the peasantry would not feel compelled to call him back to arms. Shortly thereafter, while en route between Kaler and Meghri, Nzhdeh met with a delegation from Genvaz heading to Goris, instructing them to emphasize to Soviet officials that Syunik's integration into Armenia, rather than Azerbaijan, was non-negotiable.

As the delegation headed toward Goris via Kapan, Nzhdeh and his companions continued south to Meghri. By midday on July 7, Red Army forces had surrounded the regional center of Kapan, with the Caucasian Corps' 370th and 245th Regiments entering Hanker from the direction of Barabatum and Kavart while simultaneously occupying the villages of Gyutkum, Baghaburch, Vachagan, and Bekh. On the right flank in the Voghji subregion, the Armenian regiments and 1st Caucasian Corps units pursued retreating local forces, securing Krdikend (Lernadzor), Verin Hand, Qajaran, Pkhrut, and Pirmazra (Katnarat) before advancing along the slopes of Mount Khustup toward Meghri. The Gafan (Katar/Kapan) copper mining district was captured on July 7.

On July 8, Soviet officials—including Drastamat Ter-Simonyan (Extraordinary Commissioner for Zangezur), Todorsky (Commander of the 1st Caucasian Corps), and Sviridov (Military Commissar)—issued Order No. 2 from Goris to the local population and troops. The order declared that Nzhdeh's forces were fleeing into Persia under the pressure of Soviet troops, calling on the people of Zangezur to embrace Soviet power while strictly instructing Red Army soldiers to act as protectors of the peasantry, avoid unauthorized actions, and maintain order across the region. The decree mandated that all military requisitions for livestock, provisions, and transport be channeled strictly through local revkoms with immediate payment provided, while strictly prohibiting independent seizures or individual looting. It further stipulated that local disarmament be conducted peacefully via the revkoms, reserving military force only as a last resort, and proclaimed all captured property as belonging to Soviet Armenia. To reassure the populace, the order banned personal or political vendettas, mandated the return of confiscated civilian belongings, and warned that bandits, provocateurs, and order-violators would face immediate execution.

These assurances, alongside widespread Soviet propaganda emphasizing reconciliation, fundamentally shifted the political mood among the local populace in favor of Soviet authority. The prevailing sentiment among the weary population became “brother will not shed the blood of brother”, fostering an acceptance of the political transition. Simon Vratsian vividly illustrated this psychological shift among the peasantry, observing that as the retreating nationalist leadership moved south toward Meghri, local villagers no longer welcomed them with traditional bread and salt; instead, cautious and risk-averse, the peasants avoided contact with the departing leaders to safeguard themselves against potential retribution from the incoming Soviet regime.

=== Evacuation to Persia and final fall of Meghri ===
After enduring unspeakable hardships along the way, Nzhdeh and his remaining fighters retreated to the southernmost corner of Zangezur around Meghri to prepare an escape across the border. During this retreat, Mountainous Armenia abandoned its artillery and equipment, which was captured during the Soviet advance. A vast, panic-stricken crowd had gathered on the banks of the Aras River under the scorching sun. The members of the government set about a difficult task, actively engaging in the effort to transport as many refugees as possible—especially the sick and wounded—across the Aras to the Persian bank.

For the rebels, crossing the Aras was hampered not only by a shortage of transport, but also by extortion from Amir Arshad, the autonomous khan of Mountainous Atropatene (Karadagh). Despite orders from the Tehran government to allow the refugees free passage toward Tabriz, Amir Arshad ignored these directives, alternately forbidding and allowing the crossing while demanding exorbitant fees. Initially, each refugee was charged one yellow gold coin (equivalent to nearly 2 million Republic of Armenia checks); since the earliest caravans comprised wealthier individuals who paid without difficulty, the khan greedily raised the fee to 2–3 gold coins. Most remaining refugees had no money at all and were forced to sell their final personal belongings, reaching the Persian bank completely impoverished and stripped of their resources. Consequently, the river crossing proceeded erratically with severe delays until an agreement was reached fixing the fee at half a gold coin per person, which was paid directly by Vratsian's government. Meanwhile, Garegin Nzhdeh remained in Meghri village, urgently hastening the round-the-clock crossing as Red Army forces pressed forward to seal the narrow evacuation corridor to Persia. As early as July 2, the third column of the Yerevan Red Army grouping had launched an offensive against Genvaz from the direction of Nakhichevan, with a battalion of the 177th Regiment and a mountain artillery battery advancing from Ordubad along the slopes of Mount Soyukh.

Unlike the takeover of the Kapan region, which occurred with little serious resistance from Garegin Nzhdeh's forces, the situation in Genvaz unfolded with intense combat. Heavy fighting broke out in the Kaqavaberd subregion, where defensive forces mounted a fierce resistance against the advancing Red Army units, successfully halting their progress. On July 8, Nzhdeh's fighters launched a counteroffensive, prompting Soviet commanders to commit the remaining units of the 177th Regiment alongside the 178th Regiment to reinforce the struggling battalion. The battle escalated around the slopes and surrounding hills of Mount Soyukh, which changed hands several times. Ultimately, under heavy pressure from the Armenian defenders, the Red Army forces were forced to fall back and fortify positions on the heights east of Ordubad, securing a final tactical victory for the defenders of Genvaz. Despite this success, a somber mood prevailed across the region, as both the fighters and the local populace recognized that the end of their resistance was imminent.

The tense situation along the Meghri–Ordubad front forced the leadership of the Yerevan grouping to deploy additional reinforcements to the area. Specifically, after operations concluded in Vayots Dzor, an Azerbaijani “Red Tabor” unit from the first column was transferred to Ordubad alongside other formations of the Yerevan grouping. This movement reflected the overall state of Zangezur resistance against the Red Army advance from Nakhichevan up until July 9, 1921, which marked the beginning of the decisive Soviet offensive on Genvaz from the direction of Kapan.

On July 9 and 10, Soviet forces launched a three-pronged assault against Genvaz. In the center along the Meghri River, the main body of the 1st Caucasian Corps, backed by the 4th Rifle and 1st Cavalry Regiments, advanced across the entire front line. Although local defenders mounted a desperate resistance from natural strongholds, their scattered detachments could not hold out for long and were forced to retreat rapidly toward the Aras valley. Meanwhile, from the southwest on July 10, the 108th Cavalry Regiment of the Caucasian Corps—supported by additional units—entered Genvaz from the Bartaz post in Azerbaijan. Advancing along the left bank of the Aras, these troops captured Nuvadi, Astazur (Shvanidzor), and Aldara before preparing for a final assault on the village of Meghri.

On the right flank from the direction of Nakhichevan, forces from the Yerevan grouping's third column continued their advance. As units of the Caucasian Corps and Armenian regiments entering Genvaz from Kapan and Azerbaijan converged rapidly on Meghri, Garegin Nzhdeh was forced to redeploy several detachments from the Ordubad–Meghri sector to reinforce the other two fronts. However, these hurried maneuvers by broken forces could no longer alter the situation, as virtually all of Mountainous Armenia had fallen under Soviet control. Panic intensified along the banks of the Aras River, where thousands of refugees and soldiers gathered; many threw themselves into the water rather than wait for rafts, while those who reached the Persian bank remained bewildered and directionless.

Amidst this chaotic retreat, an unidentified Englishman arrived in Tabriz and met with Simon Vratsian, claiming that all was not lost if Armenian forces could retake two or three border villages and hold off the Red Army for three to four days, promising that Allied forces would intervene to liberate Armenia. Vratsian believed this assertion and sent the Englishman alongside ARF figure Onnik Marjanyan to the Aras River to persuade the retreating troops to recapture the border villages. The troops rejected the plan and continued crossing into Persia, prompting the envoy and Marjanyan to return to Tabriz. Meanwhile, on July 9, upon learning that Soviet forces had been ordered to capture members of the Mountainous Armenian government and prominent ARF leaders, Nzhdeh instructed the government to cross the Aras that very night. By that point, nearly the entire population of the Meghri region had gathered in the village, accompanied by armed local companies, as the church bells of Meghri rang out at dawn to mark the conclusion of a year of continuous armed struggle against Soviet forces.

It was during those very days in 1920 when Soviet forces, unexpectedly entering Kapan, had demanded passage to Nakhichevan and were refused, sparking the heroic struggle of Kapargoght. Around the ancient plane tree of Meghri and along the road stretching toward the Aras, thousands of people gathered in deep emotion and anxious confusion to see off their Sparapet. Raising his hand, Nzhdeh bade them farewell, declaring: “Goodbye, heroic people—I say goodbye, not farewell…” Nzhdeh later wrote: “The people were weeping... The bells tolled mournfully. The mystical soul of Arevik wept. We were leaving our native mountains…” On July 9, Nzhdeh himself crossed the Aras River.

On July 12, troops of the Yerevan group launched a strong assault toward the village of Meghri, joining the Caucasian Corps units and the 4th Armenian Rifle and 1st Cavalry Regiments advancing from Kapan and Azerbaijan. By July 13, Soviet forces launched an all-out attack on Meghri, the regional center of Genvaz, and captured it, marking the full Soviet occupation of Zangezur.

== Aftermath ==
Several hundred fighters from Zangezur who had been unable to cross the Aras continued fighting across various parts of Genvaz for two more days. On July 14 and 15, some managed to escape into Persia—including Gerasim Atajanyan, the commander of Kapan, along with his family—while the rest dispersed and returned to their home villages. The last to cross the river was the bash-garni bandleader Khnko Asatryan, after which the simple rafts came to a final rest on the Persian bank. Reflecting on the end of the resistance, Nzhdeh noted: “My soldier fired the first bullet against the Red Army, and he was the last in all of Russia and Transcaucasia to leave the battlefield.” He wrote:

Truth demands the admission that Mountainous Armenia… remained faithful to its chosen command and leaders until the very last minute. It held firm to the conviction that we had inspired in it through word and deed over the years: never to betray the independence of the native land, and never to bow before Azerbaijan, under whatever guise it might appear. Beginning with the retreat from Sisian, when the people themselves noticed that we were leaving, they not only refrained from insulting us or striking us in the back, but the soldiers followed us by the hundreds, unwilling to part from us. We had to exert enormous effort to turn them back to their villages. To top it all off, the peasantry gathered in Meghri from various sectors of Genvaz bade us farewell with tears and weeping, as if to their own kin. Only individual leaders have left Mountainous Armenia, but the idea of the native land's independence—the ideal instilled in it—has remained indomitable among the people.

According to census records compiled on the right bank of the Aras River, 700 people paid to cross between April 25 and May 9, 392 between May 9 and 14, 713 between May 14 and 19, and 4,385 between May 19 and June 2. In addition, 400 individuals crossed free of charge during that period. Over subsequent months, a further 1,452 Western Armenian soldiers and natives of Zangezur crossed clandestinely at various points along the Aras, primarily under cover of night. In total, starting from April 1921, 8,042 people entered Persia via Genvaz.

The capture of Genvaz marked the final act, leaving all of Zangezur under Soviet control. On July 15, 1921, Sviridov, Military Commissar of the 1st Caucasian Corps, sent a telegram from Goris to Miasnikian, reporting that the corps was pleased to announce the restoration of revolutionary order across Zangezur, with local revkoms instructed to organize governance within their jurisdiction. That same day, the newspaper Sovetakan Hayastan published an editorial titled “The Adventure Is Crushed”, reporting that more than 300 prominent or notable Dashnak and SR political figures had crossed the Aras into Persia, where they were expected to continue their active opposition against Soviet rule from abroad. Throughout the conflict, desertion from the Separate Caucasian Army between August and December 1921 accounted for 1,853 men.

Sergo Ordzhonikidze contacted Miasnikian to congratulate the government and people of Soviet Armenia on the “liberation of Zangezur”. On July 20, 1921, Miasnikian, serving as Chairman of the Council of People's Commissars and People's Commissar for Military Affairs of the Armenian SSR, issued an order to the armed forces of the republic. In it, he expressed gratitude to the fighters and commanders for their endurance and self-sacrifice during the Zangezur battles, conveying his confidence that Armenia's Red Army would honorably fulfill its supreme duty of defending the republic's borders and ensuring the safety and tranquility of its people.

In response to this decree, Velikanov, Commander of the RSFSR Rifle Division and the Yerevan Grouping of Forces, dispatched a greeting that same day to Miasnikian, stating: “On behalf of the Red Army soldiers, commanders, and commissars of the Yerevan Grouping, we express our deep gratitude to the fighters who liberated Zangezur from the rule of the Dashnaks.” Velikanov also voiced confidence that the forces would justify the Armenian SSR Council of People's Commissars' hopes for establishing fraternal relations with the local population, concluding with cheers for Soviet Zangezur, the unity of the Red Army and local authorities, and the Armenian SSR government.

Concurrently, Molkachanov, Chief of Staff of the Armenian Red Army, telegraphed the command of the 11th Red Army, reporting that the units of Soviet Armenia's forces had displayed exemplary bravery, heroism, and devotion. In recognition of these actions, the Soviet Armenian government and the command of the Separate Caucasian Army awarded state honors, ceremonial weapons, and souvenirs to a large group of distinguished fighters, commanders, and political workers.

Later, during its session on August 3, 1921, the Council of People's Commissars of the Armenian SSR passed a decree awarding the Order of the Red Banner of the Armenian SSR to key Soviet commanders for suppressing the resistance in Zangezur: Gekker (Commander of the Separate Caucasian Army), Todorsky (Commander of the Caucasian Corps), Velikanov (Commander of the RSFSR 20th Rifle Division), and Dmitri Mirimanov (Commander of the Armenian SSR Rifle Brigade). The same decision presented battle flags to the Separate Caucasian Army, the RSFSR 20th Rifle Division, the Armenian SSR Rifle Brigade, the 3rd Armenian SSR Rifle Regiment, the Lori Infantry Regiment, and the Cavalry Regiment of the Separate Armenian Cavalry Brigade.

The Soviet central government in Yerevan, led by Alexander Miasnikian, offered a general amnesty to the rebels and provided firm guarantees that Zangezur would remain part of the Armenian Soviet Socialist Republic rather than being ceded to Azerbaijan. During the conflict, Zangezur's Azerbaijani minority was expelled and/or massacred by Nzhdeh's forces.

=== Armenian nationalist perspective ===
Aram Simonyan underscores that the conclusion of the Zangezur resistance movement (1920–1921) was not viewed by its participants or later historiography as an outright defeat, but rather as a strategic victory. Contemporary Armenian observers and political figures, such as Simon Vratsian, noted that Soviet press outlets acknowledged the extraordinary nature of the resistance, while opposing Azerbaijani soldiers recalled Nzhdeh's leadership with immense respect despite their defeat. While neighboring Karabakh and Nakhchivan were assigned to Soviet Azerbaijan, the prolonged conflict in Zangezur led Soviet authorities to guarantee the region's permanence within Soviet Armenia as a condition to end the rebellion.

=== Soviet perspective ===
Official Soviet records and military framing categorized the campaign in Zangezur strictly as a military victory resulting in the “destruction of the Dashnaks in Zangezur” and the necessary elimination of an anti-Soviet stronghold to consolidate Red Army control. Other historians also share this perspective. High-ranking military decorations, including the Order of the Red Banner, were officially bestowed upon Red Army commanders such as Anatoly Gekker and Ivan Todorsky for successfully conducting the operation. Rather than publicly framing the outcome as yielding to local rebel demands, Soviet authorities officially presented the final transfer of Zangezur to Armenia as a “symbol of socialist friendship”. Following the end of hostilities, official state outlets such as the newspaper Sovetakan Hayastan declared that the region had safely “entered the embrace of its native Soviet Armenia”.

== See also ==
- February Uprising
- First Republic of Armenia
- Republic of Mountainous Armenia
