= Ilya Tsivtsivadze =

Ilya Benediktovich Tsivtsivadze (Georgian: ილია წივწივაძე; March 20, 1881 – March 15, 1938) was a Georgian Communist politician.

Born in Khoni, Tsivtsivadze hailed from a peasant family. He studied at the Kutaisi Theological Seminary, but had to leave his studies in 1902 for his revolutionary propagandist activities. He joined the Russian Social Democratic Labour Party in 1903. In 1903-1904 he worked with the printing of the clandestine publications of the Tbilisi and Batumi committees of the party. During the 1905-1907 revolution he worked with the organizing the party in the Transcaucasus and was editor of the newspaper Dro. In 1911 he became the leader of the party activities in Moscow. In 1915 he was exiled to Irkutsk. Following the February Revolution he became the main organizer of the RSDLP(b) in the Zamoskvoretskogo district and a member of the Moscow Committee of the party. In December 1917 he became deputy chairman of the Moscow revolutionary tribunal. In 1919-1921 he was a member of the Central Auditing Commission of the Communist Party. He worked from 1921 onwards for the sovnarkom of the Georgian SSR and was deputy chairman of the executive board of Tbilisi. In 1923 he shifted to administrative work in Moscow. He was a delegate at the 8th and the 9th congresses of the party and member of the VTsIK.
