= Dro =

Dro or DRO may refer to:

== Places ==
- Dro, Trentino, Italy, a commune
- Drouin railway station, Victoria, Australia
- Durango-La Plata County Airport, Colorado, United States (IATA code: DRO)
- San Leandro, city near Oakland, California

== People ==
- Drastamat Kanayan, Armenian general known as Dro
- Edwige-Renée Dro, Ivorian writer, translator and literary activist
- Young Dro, American rapper
- Dro Fernández, Spanish footballer

== Organizations ==
- Dro Records, Discos Radioactivos Organizados
- Dro (Georgian newspaper), a Georgian newspaper
- U.S. Immigration and Customs Enforcement Office of Detention and Removal

== Technology ==
- Dielectric resonator oscillator
- Digital read-out, a precision measuring instrument used in machinery and metalworking
- Distant retrograde orbit, a highly stable lunar orbit
- Dro, slang for hydroponically-grown marijuana
- Dynamic range optimizer, a setting on some digital cameras

== Other uses ==
- Darwin Reconnaissance Orbiter, a fictional spacecraft from Alien Planet
- Debt relief order, a form of bankruptcy in England and Wales
- Disaster relief operation
