= Dro (Georgian newspaper) =

Dro (Georgian: დრო, 'Time') was a daily Georgian language Bolshevik newspaper, published in Tbilisi from March 24, 1907, to April 28, 1907. The editor of Dro was Ilya Tsivtsivadze. Amongst the people involved in the newspaper were Joseph Stalin, M. G. Tskhakaya and M. Davitashvili. The newspaper was published several articles of Lenin. Dro was central in mobilizing the bolshevik positions in the Caucasus ahead of the 5th Congress of the Russian Social Democratic Labour Party. After 31 editions, Dro was closed down by state authorities.
