= Quirijn Maurits Rudolph Ver Huell =

Dutch writer and painter (1787–1860)

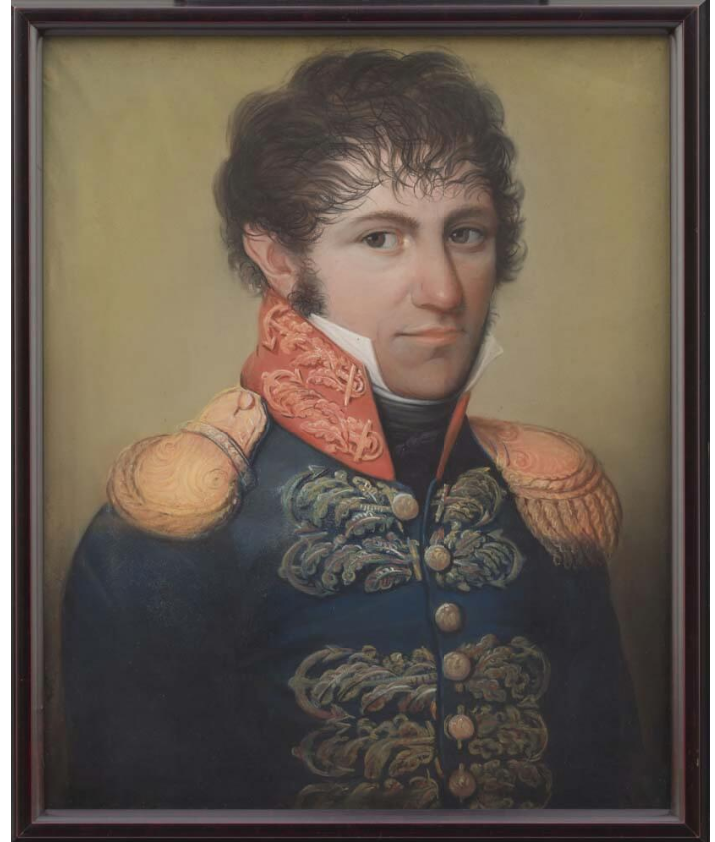
- Portrait of Quirijn Ver Huell
- Born: 11 September 1787; Zutphen, Dutch Republic
- Died: 10 May 1860 (aged 72); Arnhem, Kingdom of the Netherlands
- Military career
- Allegiance: Batavian Republic; First French Empire; Kingdom of the Netherlands
- Branch: (Netherlands) Dutch Navy; (Batavian Republic) Batavian Navy; French Navy
- Service years: 1802–1850
- Rank: Rear-admiral
- Commands: Admiraal Evertsen
- Conflicts: War of the Third Coalition; Napoleon's planned invasion of the United Kingdom; Battle of Blanc-Nez and Gris-Nez; War of the Fourth Coalition; War of the Fifth Coalition; War of the Sixth Coalition

Quirijn Maurits Rudolph Ver Huell (Note: According to Akveld the first given name was actually Quirinus, not Quirijn, and his nickname was actually Maurits;) (also Verhuell or VerHuell; 11 September 1787 – 10 May 1860) was a Dutch naval officer, writer, painter, watercolorist and entomologist. He played an important role in the suppression of the insurrection of Pattimura on Saparua in 1817. He was the captain of the Dutch ship of the line Zr. Ms. Admiraal Evertsen when that ship foundered near Diego Garcia in 1819 with an important cargo of irreplaceable botanical specimens on board, that had been gathered by the founder of the Bogor Botanical Gardens, Caspar Georg Carl Reinwardt. He was something of a polymath, who earned a reputation as a naturalist and in particular as an illustrator of works of botany, zoology and entomology (especially lepidopterology). He was the last director of the renowned naval shipyard of Rotterdam. He received several high decorations, among which that of Knight 3rd class of the Military Order of William. He played an important role in the social and cultural life of Rotterdam. He was the father of Alexander Willem Maurits Carel Ver Huell.

== Early life ==
Ver Huell was born in Zutphen, the son of Everhart Alexander Ver-Huel, twice burgomaster of Doesburg, and Anna Aleida Staring.

== Personal life ==
Ver Huell married in 1821 with Christina Louisa Johanna Hester de Vaynes van Brakell (1796–1863), a watercolorist, and member of the De Vaynes van Brakell family. The draftsman Jhr. Alexander Willem Maurits Carel Ver Huell is their son.

== Naval career ==
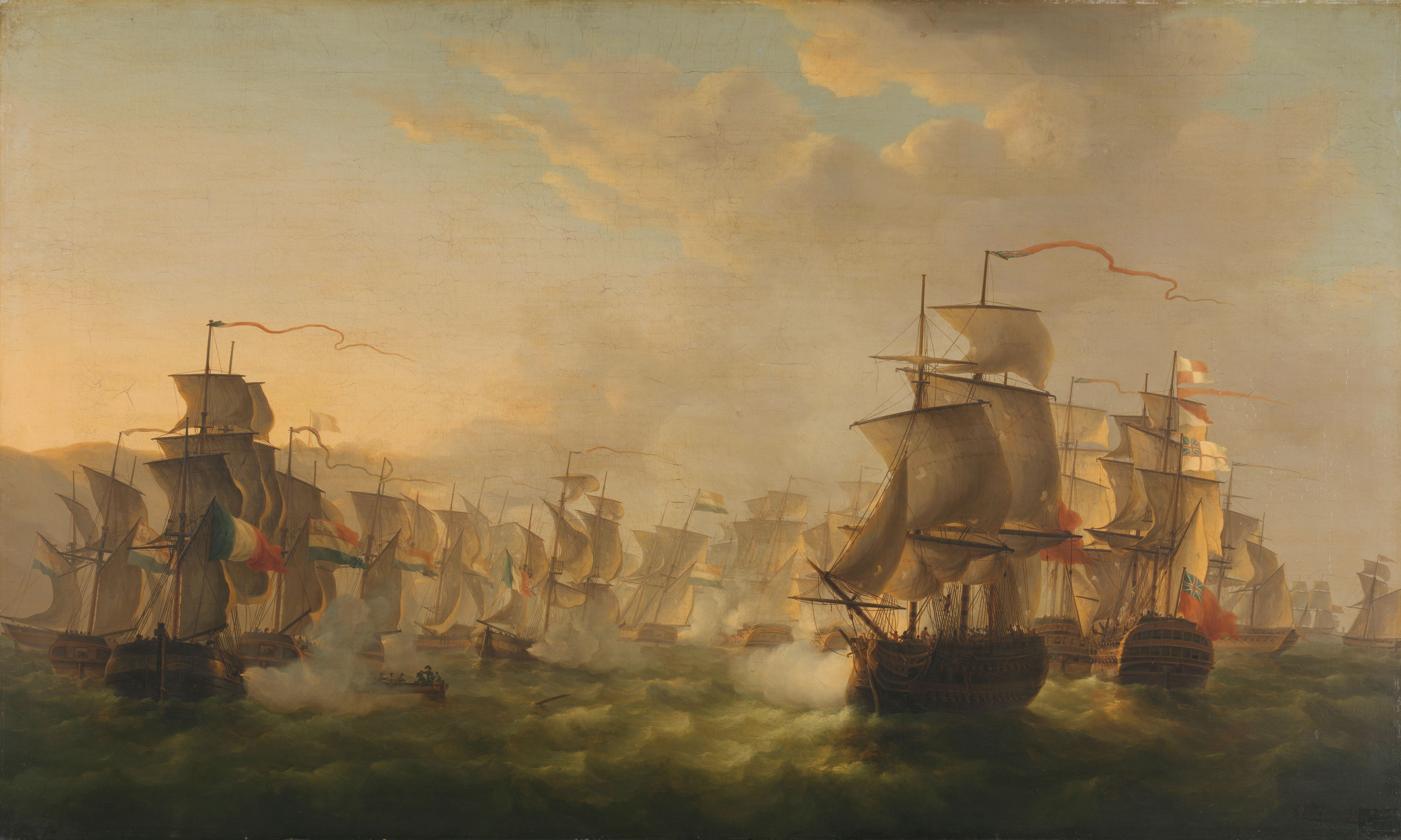
Battle of Blanc-Nez and Gris-Nez, 18 July 1805, by Martinus Schouman

Ver Huell joined the Batavian Navy in 1802 as a cadet (Note: His first ship was the ship of the line Hersteller.) and accompanied his uncle, Admiral Carel Hendrik Ver Huell, in his sea campaign against the British. He took part in the perilous journey of Batavian light craft from Dunkirk to Ambleteuse on 17–18 July 1805 during which he distinguished himself, leading to his promotion to midshipman first class. (Note: During this journey he made a sketch that was used by Martinus Schouman for his painting "The Dutch and English fleets meet on the way to Boulogne, 1805")

In 1807 he was promoted to second lieutenant in the navy of the Kingdom of Holland, and made adjutant of Rear-Admiral Arnold Adriaan Buyskes, who had been appointed governor-general of the Dutch East Indies by King Louis Bonaparte, on his voyage to the Indies. Ver Huell had been posted on the brig Vlieg (under command of Capt. Krekel). He was accompanied by Jean Chrétien Baud, who would become a lifelong friend. The ship made it as far as the Bay of All Saints, where it had to stay for two months for repairs to its masts. When they were ready to depart the Vlieg was intercepted by a combined British-Portuguese squadron that interned the crew. They were kept as prisoners of war in relative comfort. Ver Huell was able to make a number of sketches of the landscape and Brazilian people. The Portuguese authorities eventually released the two friends and allowed them to return home on an English ship in 1809. He later described this voyage in his memoir Myn eerste zeereize (1842).

In 1809 he was promoted to First Lieutenant and as such he was (after the annexation of the Kingdom of Holland by France in 1810) appointed adjutant of his uncle in the service of the French Imperial navy as a lieutenant de vaisseau. After two further promotions in 1811, he left the French service in 1813 (unlike his uncle, who remained loyal to France). He was accepted in the new (or restored) Dutch navy as a captain lieutenant, and was sent out to the Indies in 1815 where he remained until 1819. (See his Mijne herinneringen aan eene reis naar Oost-Indië.) (Note: Akveld fills in a lacuna in the narrative of Van der Aa. He indicates that af first he younger Ver Huell was politically tainted by association with his uncle Carel Ver Huell, who had put his loyalty to Napoleon above his patriotism by defending the fortress of Den Helder against the Dutch troops of the new Principality of the Netherlands under Sovereign Prince William. So he was not really as welcome as Van der Aa suggests. And it took until 1815 for things to calm down enough that he could get an active commission.)

=== Ambon revolt of 1817 ===
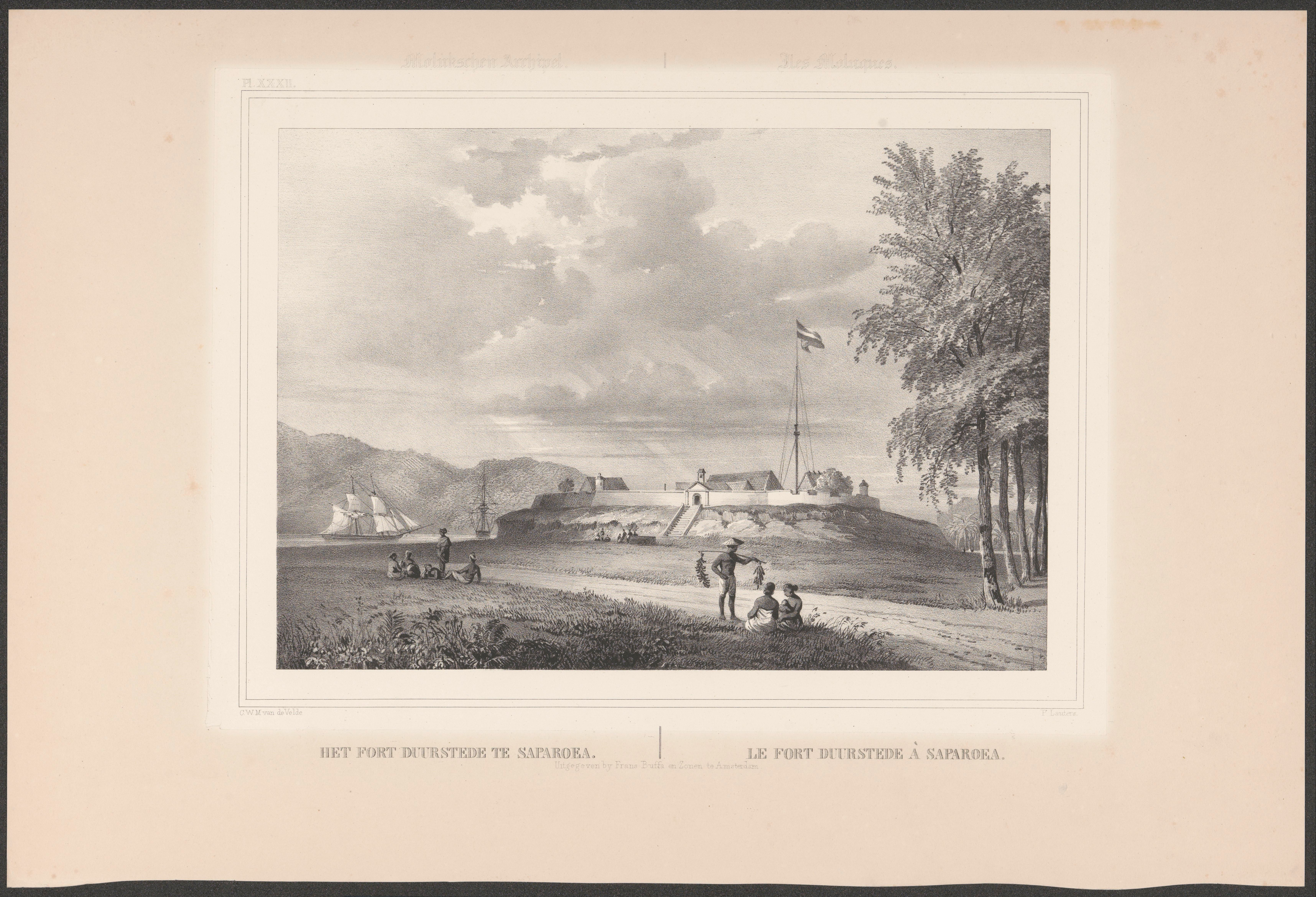
View of Fort Duurstede, where the massacre took place

On 15 May 1817 an indigenous leader Thomas Matulessy, by the pseudonym Pattimura, of the people of the island of Saparua, east of Ambon Island, in what is now the Indonesian province of Maluku, started a revolt against the Dutch colonial government. The Dutch Fort Duurstede was taken the next day by the insurgents. The Resident, Johannes Rudolph van den Berg, his wife, three of his four children, and their governess, and 19 Dutch soldiers of the garrison, were killed. The only survivor was the fourth child, Jean Lubbert, five years at the time. (Note: The child was later found again and handed over to Ver Huell, who took care that it was returned to its grandparents.) The massacre caused great outrage among the Dutch colonists. But a hastily assembled punitive expedition was easily defeated by the insurgents. The Governor-General Godert van der Capellen (Note: Van der Capellen was actually one member of a triumvirate, the so-called Commissioners-General of the Dutch East Indies, that was sent out by the Dutch king to take over the government of the Indies from the British Lieutenant-Governor of Java, John Fendall Jr. under the provisions of the Anglo-Dutch Treaty of 1814.) sacked the Dutch officials he considered responsible for the unrest through misrule and ordered Rear-Admiral Buyskes (Note: The same who had been Ver Huell's boss on the 1807 voyage to the Indies.) to mount an expedition to restore order on Saparua. (Note: The expeditionary force comprised about 500 Dutch colonial infantry soldiers, and about 1500 Alfoers, and other auxiliary troops, among which a number of impressed Ternate recruits, whose reliability was questionable, and mercenaries from Tidore. The native troops were led by the princes Toesan and Kimelaha Doekimi. They used war proas, called corra-corras for their transportation and landing operations. And several Dutch warships, among which the ship of the line Admiraal Evertsen under command of acting captain Ver Huell, who had been first officer until the untimely death of captain, D.H. Dietz, who died in office.)

Ver Huell's ship, the Admiraal Evertsen, and he himself (Note: Though Ver Huell was only a Captain-Lieutenant, he became the acting commander of the flotilla, of which also the ship of the line Nassau was a part, when the captain of that ship, who was the senior officer, committed suicide.) were to play an important role in the expedition. The campaign unfolded with the following typical pattern. A Dutch warship, accompanied by a fleet of corra-corras would approach an island in the hands of the insurgents. The warship would fire a few broadsides to impress the insurgents. This usually was enough to have the civilian population flee into the bush. Then the warship would land parties of soldiers and armed crew members (there were few marines present), and the corra-corras likewise would unload the auxiliary troops. Skirmishes with insurgents would take place, which usually would end with a Dutch victory. The surviving insurgents would be rounded up and put in irons. Sometimes an "exemplary punishment" would be meted out to the captives, like the one in Pelauw on the island of Haruku, where 23 "ringleaders" were summarily executed.

Ver Huell was not personally present at this arguable atrocity, but later related this event in his memoir Herinneringen. He thought the punishment "harsh, but necessary". With a certain satisfaction he concluded that the insurgents that were still at large were so cowed by the Dutch terror, that they came in and surrendered, as did the remaining civilian population. The Dutch authorities then magnanimously pardoned them, after they swore to obey henceforth the local feudal lord, or Raja (who had been deposed by Pattimura) (Note: Formally, the Dutch colonial authorities had treaty relations with these Rajas, who remained formally the rulers of the territories. The Resident was there to "advise" them. At this time only parts of Java were under direct Dutch rule. Cf. Dutch East Indies) and accept the Dutch colonial authority.

Kemp, who based his own, later published version of events partly on Ver Huell's memoir, disagrees with Ver Huell's positive assessment. He calls the execution "needlessly cruel" and condemns in particular the bloody way in which it was conducted. He thinks that this contributed to the desperate defense by the Saparuan rebels later in the year, and so proved counterproductive from the viewpoint of the Dutch colonial government.

Eventually, Pattimura and his companions, and the Radja of Nusa Laut, Paulus Tiahahu, and his daughter Martha Christina Tiahahu), were cornered and defeated after heroic resistance. Pattimura himself was betrayed by the Radja of Booi. Tiahahu was summarily shot in Fort Beverwijk on Nusa Laut. The other men were condemned to die and hanged in front of Fort Victoria on the island of Ambon. Ver Huell was as commander of the Admiraal Evertsen directly involved in the arrest of Pattimura. The ship transported the insurgent chiefs from Saparua to Ambon. (Note: He relates how he received a diamond comb, that had been the property of the murdered Mrs. Van den Berg, and had been found on the person of Pattimura. After his return to the Netherlands he made sure that the comb was given to the surviving son of the Van den Bergs.)

Ver Huell was impressed with the beauty and self-assuredness of Martha Christina, who was also his prisoner on board the Evertsen, so much so, that he later made her the heroine of his novel, Christina Martha. He relates that, though she was released by Buyskes, after the Rear-Admiral had personally interviewed Pattimura, she chose to remain with her father to the end.

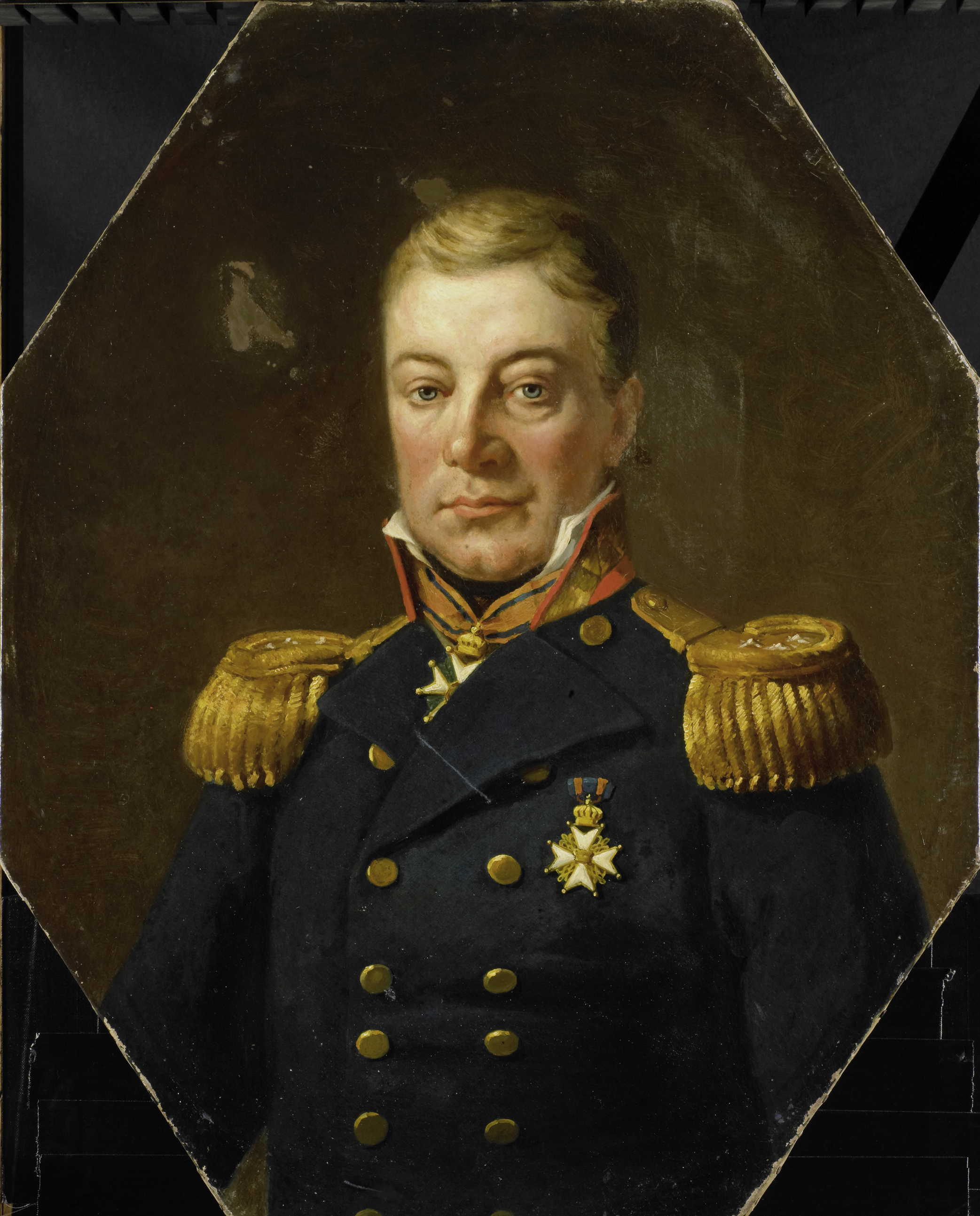
Rear-Admiral Buyskes, leader of the expedition

Ver Huell was also present at the execution of Pattimura and the other ringleaders on Ambon on 16 December 1817. He narrates the event extensively in his memoir. He describes how the executioner botched the first execution, of a heavy-set man named "Latoemahina" (the rope broke, and the man had to be hanged a second time). Pattimura (Note: Whom Ver Huell persistently calls by his birth name Matulessy.) met his death calmly, politely greeting Buyskes, according to his narrative. Martha Christina, who remained with her father till the last moment, was after the execution released to a local schoolmaster, but she absconded and spent time in the wilderness, living on whatever she could find, But she was recaptured and brought aboard the Evertsen where Ver Huell was amazed to meet her again. He assured her that she would not be harmed, and gave her a cabin to herself. But she only regarded him with contempt. She died aboard ship, apparently of a sudden illness.

Though most leaders of the expedition later received one or the other degree of the Military Order of William (each according to his military status; Buyskes was made a Commandeur), Ver Huell was only much later (in 1841) rewarded with the Military Order of William 3rd class, for his conduct during that campaign. This was a result of the fact that he lost his ship, the Admiraal Evertsen, in a shipwreck near Diego Garcia.

=== The shipwreck of the Admiraal Evertsen ===
In the year after the campaign against the Moluccan insurgents Ver Huell spent most of his leisure time exploring the Indonesian archipel and its natural wonders. He made a large number of sketches and aquarels, and collected all kinds of zoological and herbal specimens. (Note: At one occasion the Sultan of Ternate, Muhammad Ali, gave him fifteen birds of paradise as specimens.) He had a large amount of free time, because the Admiraal Evertsen was showing its bad shape and had to be put in drydock repeatedly for urgent repairs. This foreshadowed the problems that were to come. Of course, Ver Huell was not the only naturalist working in Indonesia at the time. A much more important name was that of Caspar Georg Carl Reinwardt, the founder of the botanical gardens at Buitenzorg, who was amassing a large collection of specimens, intended for the Hortus Botanicus of Leiden University. It was this important cargo that was put aboard the Admiraal Evertsen when the ship was sent home to the Netherlands with the royal commissioners Elout and Buyskes.

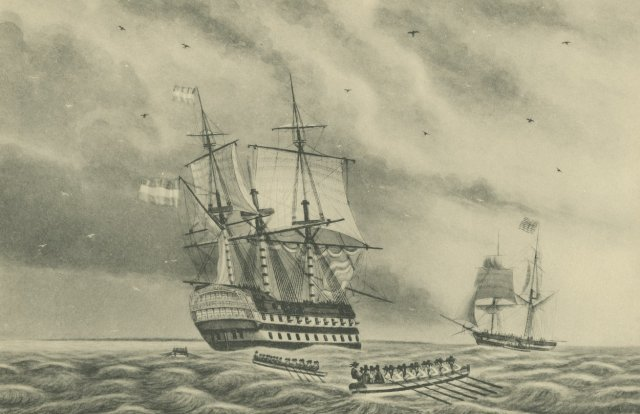
Zr. Ms.Admiraal Evertsen just before foundering near Diego Garcia in 1819 by Q.M.R. Ver Huell (Note: In background the American brig Pickering)

Early March 1819 the ship left for Patria. Soon the ship began falling slowly apart. The pumps had to be worked constantly. Rear-Admiral Buyskes, though only a passenger, began to interfere with Ver Huell's command, and ordered him to go to the isolated atoll of Diego Garcia. When the ship arrived there on 10 April it was in a very bad shape. Ver Huell spied another ship in the lagoon. It turned out to be the American merchant brig Pickering (capt. Samuel B. Edes). Edes came aboard the Evertsen, and advised not to cross the coral reef around the atoll, and Buyskes concurred. He overrode Ver Huell and the order to abandon ship was given. Both Reinwardt's irreplaceable collection and Ver Huell's personal one were lost in the shipwreck. The Pickering picked up the crew of the Admiraal Evertsen and first brought them ashore on Diego Garcia, at the French settlement of Pointe de l'Est. As it was unlikely that they would be picked up there by another ship (in view of the isolated location of the atoll) the Pickering then ferried the crew in two stages to Mauritius. This took about six weeks to complete during which time Ver Huell again made a number of sketches and watercolors of the natural wonders of the atoll. From Mauritius Ver Huell and the crew left on 29 July 1819 for the Netherlands on the British merchantman Cadmus. They arrived at Hellevoetsluis on 25 November 1819.

The naval authorities then had Ver Huell court-martialed as the captain responsible for the loss of the Admiraal Evertsen, but he was acquitted. Nevertheless, he was not given a new command, so that he had to remain on shore, a situation that could be compared to the British custom of half pay. He repaired to his parents in Doesburg as a private citizen. Het met his future wife during that period of inactivity. To get an income he accepted an appointment as onderequipagemeester (deputy superintendent) of the naval shipyard in Rotterdam.

=== Later naval career ===
After having been promoted to captain in 1826, he accepted a position at the naval shipyard in Rotterdam where he became equipagemeester (superintendent) in 1828, and in 1839 he became director, and commander of the Navy in the main navy department of the Maas.In this position of authority he finally received the recognition he thought he deserved. At the gala dinner held at the occasion of the visit of King William II to Rotterdam in 1841, for instance, he sat next to the King's son, Prince Hendrik. During the dinner the two gentlemen agreed to found the Royal Dutch Dutch Yachtclub, the predecessor of the Koninklijke Nederlandsche Zeil en Roei Vereeniging . A building owned by the club, its modelkamer (Models Room), became in 1874 the Maritime Museum Rotterdam.

In 1840 he received the Order of the Netherlands Lion and in 1841 he was finally made a knight 3rd class in the Military Order of William for his role in the suppression of the Ambon insurrection. When czar Nicholas I of Russia visited Rotterdam, he was made a knight 3rd class of the Order of Saint Vladimir. King William II made him a commander in the Order of the Oak Crown (Note: A Luxemburg order, but William was Grand Duke of that country.) in 1844.

In 1850 (by then a Rear-Admiral) he was pensioned off when the naval shipyard was closed.

== Work as a naturalist ==
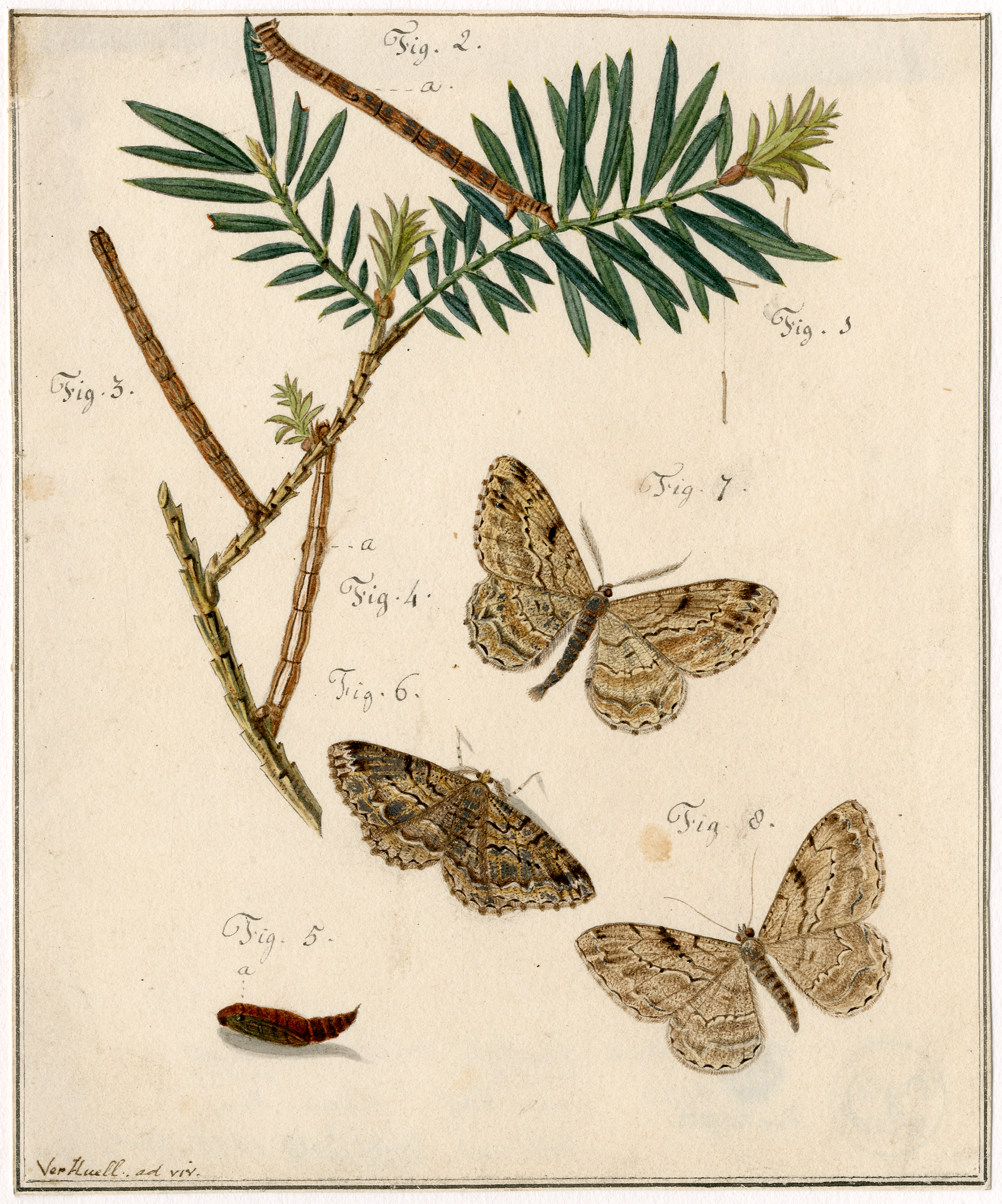
Rups, pop en mot met dennetakje (Note: Caterpillar, pupa and moth with pine twig; Q.M.R. Ver Huell, Handboek voor liefhebbers en verzamelaars van vlinders, Rotterdam 1842)

During his naval career Ver Huell had also pursued a parallel career as an artist and a naturalist (often in combination). This started even before he became acting captain of the Admiraal Evertsen when the ship traveled to Celebes, to take over from the British occupiers, (Note: Under the Convention of London the Dutch were restored in their rights as colonial rulers of the East Indies, and the mission of the Dutch expedition was to implement this treaty.) and re-establish relations with the king of Gowa, Tumenanga ri Katangka, and was entertained by that monarch; he also went hunting for butterflies and caught an Attacus atlas. As acting captain of the Admiraal Evertsen (Note: Ver Huell had been first officer of the ship, but the captain, D.H. Dietz died in office.) he traveled to the Banda Islands in March 1817 to claim them again for the Netherlands after the British occupation. He left the actual government work to the Resident J. Berkhoff. whom he, as Commissioner for the East Indies government, appointed and installed on 2 April 1817. The next day he climbed the volcano Gunung Api, together with some young officers. He had ample time to survey the islands and become acquainted with their inhabitants, the perkeniers (Note: Dutch plantation owners.) and their slaves. He even started a liaison with a female perkenier. During his perambulations Ver Huell made sketches and watercolors, that he much later published, and also hunted butterflies. (Note: Lepidopterology had been a hobby of his from his youth. In 1842 he published Handboek voor liefhebbers en verzamelaars van vlinders (Manual for fanciers and collectors of butterflies) Cf. Straver, p.68, note 28) He used what he learned for his 1842 memoir Herinneringen van eene reis naar de Oost-Indiën (Note: Memories of a voyage to the East Indies) that was interesting as a curiosity for his contemporaries, but remained superficial, as it contained little of interest about the culture and social situation in the area.

Ver Huell often illustrated works of famous naturalists, who sought him out for his knowledge, like Friedrich Anton Wilhelm Miquel with whom he published Illustrationes piperacearum (1844) and Stirpes Surinamenses selectae (1851), the botanist Willem Hendrik de Vriese and the zoologist Jan van der Hoeven. The genus Verhuellia in the family Piperaceae was named in his honor. (Note: Cf. List of plant genera named for people (Q–Z).) He helped illustrate the works of the Dutch entomologist Jan Sepp. He also made many illustrations for the Flora Brasiliensis, edited by Carl Friedrich Philipp von Martius et al.

He also wrote a biography of his uncle Admiral Carel Hendrik Verhuell, and biographical articles about vice-admiral Hendrik Alexander Ruysch, lieutenant Pieter Bezemer (Note: Commander of the sloop Havik that was captured at Saldanha Bay.) and captain-lieutenant H. Zwedenrijk Carp (Note: Commanding the gunboat Haay, part of the ill-fated Dutch East Indies squadron under Vice-Admiral Pieter Hartsinck that was defeated by the Royal Navy in the Java campaign of 1806–1807) in the journal Tijdschrift aan het Zeewezen gewijd.

== Later life ==
After he retired, he left Rotterdam, where he had been a member of the art societies Hierdoor tot Hooger and Arti sacrum vereenigd, and an elder in the Walloon church, and moved to Arnhem, where he could devote himself full-time to his scientific studies and other pastimes. Ver Huell died in Arnhem on 10 May 1860.

== Publications ==
- Mijne herinneringen aan eene reis naar Oost-Indië (2 vols, Rotterdam 1836, republished in Werken van de Linschoten-Vereeniging vol. 107, Zutphen 2008
- Levensherinneringen, 1787-1812
- Christina Martha : Oosters romantisch historisch tafereel, 1837, 2013
- Verslag van eenen kruistogt : volvoerd in den jare 1836, met Z.M. Fregat Diana, onder de bevelen van den Kapitein ter Zee A. Anemaet, in den Oosterschen Archipel, bewesten het Eiland Nieuw-Guinea, z.p., 1840
- De leidsman op het pad der eer, voornamelijk bestemd voor jonge lieden in dienst der Marine. Rotterdam 1840
- Mijn eerste zeereizen, Rotterdam 1842
- Handboek voor liefhebbers en verzamelaars van vlinders, Rotterdam 1842
- (with Friedrich Anton Wilhelm Miquel): Illustrationes piperacearum, Serie: Nova acta Academiae Caesareae Leopoldino-Carolinae Germanicae Naturae Curiosorum, Bd. 21, 1844
- (with Friedrich Anton Wilhelm Miquel): Stirpes Surinamenses selectae, Lugduni Batavorum [Leiden] : Apud Arnz. & Soc., 1850 [i.e. 1851], Serie:Natuurkundige verhandelingen van de Hollandsche Maatschappij der Wetenschappen te Haarlem, 2 Verzameling, 7e d.
- De Koninklijke Nederlandsche Yacht Club (Amsterdam 1848).
- Het leven en karakter van Carel Hendrik graaf Ver Huell. Uit nagelaten aanteekeningen en andere authentieke stukken beschreven (2 vols, Amsterdam 1874).
- De reis van Z.M. ‘De Vlieg’, commandant Willem Kreekel, naar Brazilië, 1807–1808. (H.J. de Graaf, ed.) The Hague 1976

He also wrote articles in the Album der Natuur and the Tijdschrift aan het zeewezen gewijd, among others.

== Sources ==
- Aa, A. J. van der, ed. (1876). "Quirijn Maurits Rudolph Ver-Huell". Biografisch Woordenboek der Nederlanden. Deel 19 (DBNL) (in Dutch). pp. 158–163.
- Akveld, L.M. (1989). "Maurits Ver Huell en zijn reis door het voormalige Nederlands-Indië aan boord van het linieschip 'Admiraal Evertsen' in de jaren 1816-1819". Indische Letteren (in Dutch). 4: 3–20.
- F. Jos. van den Branden; J.G. Frederiks, eds. (1888–1891). "Quirijn Maurits Rudolph Ver Huell". Biographisch woordenboek der Noord- en Zuidnederlandsche letterkunde (DBNL) (in Dutch).
- Kemp, P.H. van der (1912). "Het herstel van het Nederlandsch gezag in de Molukken in 1817, naar oorspronkelijke stukken. DERDE GEDEELTE. De bedwinging van den opstand in de Molukken door schout-bij-nacht Buijskes". Bijdragen tot de Taal-, Land- en Volkenkunde van Nederlandsch-Indië (in Dutch). 66 (1): 1, 3–167. JSTOR 20769637.
- Zonneveld, P. van (1995). "Pattimura en het kind van Saparua. De Molukken-opstand van 1817 in de Indisch-Nederlandse literatuur". Indische Letteren. JRG, 10 (in Dutch). 10: 41–54.
- Straver, Hans (2015). "Liefhebber, meer dan kenner der Natuurlijke Historie". Indische Letteren (in Dutch). 30: 60–77.
- Resnikoff, Howard L.; Wenban-Smith, Nigel (January 2013). "Shipwreck and Artwork" (PDF). Chagos News.The Periodical Newsletter of the Chagos Conservation Trust and Chagos Conservation Trust US (41).
- Ver Huel, Q.M.R. (1835). Herinneringen van eene reis naar de Oost-Indien. Eerste Deel (in Dutch). Haarlem: Vincent Loosjes.
