= Alexander Willem Maurits Carel Ver Huell =

Dutch artist and writer (1822–1897)

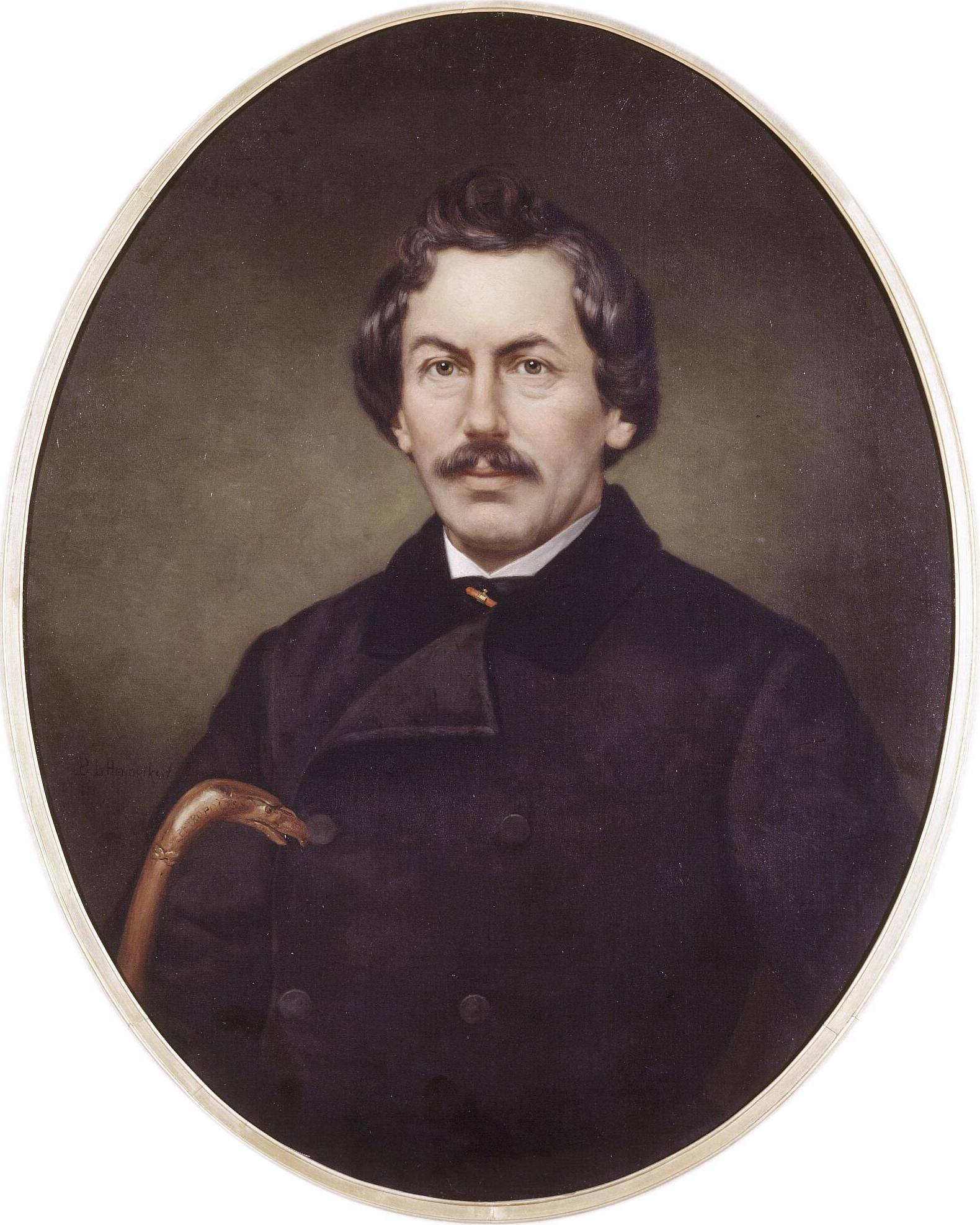
- Portrait of Ver Huell (1895) by B.L. Hendriks
- Born: 7 March 1822; Doesburg, Netherlands
- Died: 28 May 1897 (aged 75); Arnhem, Netherlands
- Education: Leiden University
- Occupation: Writer
- Writing career
- Language: Dutch
- Years active: 1848-1897

Alexander Willem Maurits Carel Ver Huell (7 March 1822 – 28 May 1897) was a Dutch artist and writer.

== Life ==
Ver Huell was the son of Quirijn Maurits Rudolph Ver Huell, naval officer and naturalist, and jkvr. Christina Louisa Johanna Hester de Vaynes van Brakell, aquarellist. After his secondary education in Rotterdam he studied law at Leiden University, where he obtained a doctorate on propositions (Note: In the Netherlands, as elsewhere, to obtain a doctorate one needs to write and defend a doctoral thesis. Traditionally, the doctorandus also formulates a number of propositions, which he also defends during his oral examination. Formerly, in Ver Huell's day, it was possible to omit the defense of a thesis, and only defend propositions.) After he finished his studies he moved permanently to Arnhem. He was very wealthy, which enabled him to become a philanthropist. Among his many donations to good works was a large gift to the Stichting Asyl voor oude en gebrekkige zeelieden (Note: Foundation Asylum for Old and Needy Mariners.) in Brielle in 1872. In 1897 he made the municipality of Arnhem heir to his collection of works of art, which formed the basis for the collection of Museum Arnhem. After his death it turned out that he left a bequest of 1 million guilders to the municipality of Doesburg to be used for the construction of a bridge across the river IJssel.

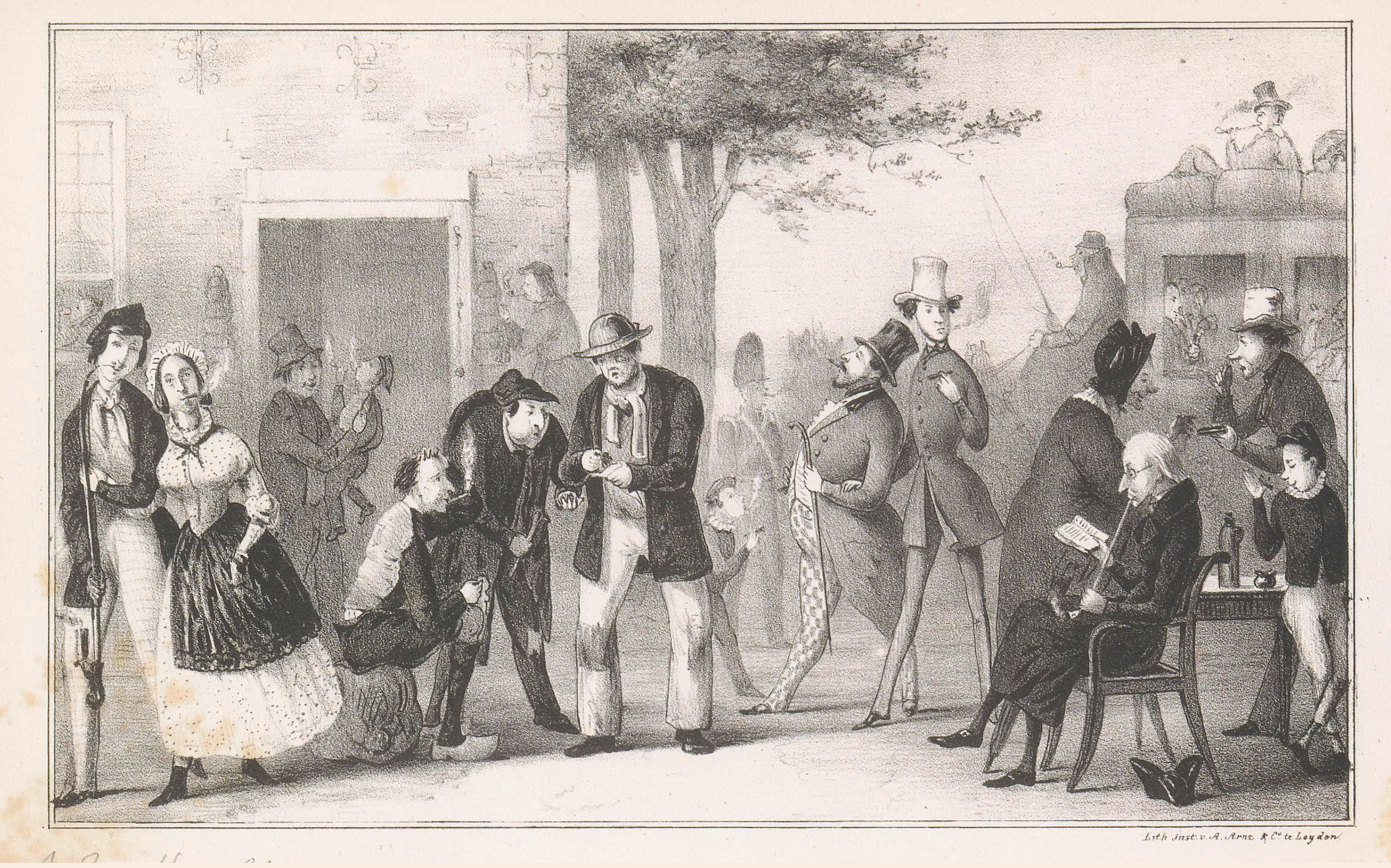
A. Ver Huell, Het Nicotiaanse Kruid (Note: Cartoon with satirical poem entitled "The Nicotian Drug", in Leidse Studentenalmanak (1843))

Ver Huell didn't lead a life of leisure, however. He became renowned for his humoristic sketches both in written form and in the form of illustrations and cartoons., often directed at the life of university students. He used the pseudonym O.Veralby, which is a Dutch pun. If one pronounces it quickly it sounds like overal bij (present everywhere). Under this pseudonym he produced illustrations for the Dutch satirical writer Johannes Kneppelhout, who used the pseudonym Klikspaan.

Ver Huell's last days were sad and lonely. He died, 75 years old, in his residence Arnhem.

== Publications ==
=== Original publications ===
- Vier boeken in het leven (1851)
- Zijn er zoo? (1851)
- Schetsen met de pen, (Amsterdam, 3 vols. 1853, 1861, 1876);
- De mensch op en buiten de aarde. Gedachten over ruimte, tijd en eeuwigheid, (anonymous; Amsterdam 1855);
- Volk en kunst (Amsterdam 1862);
- Cornelis Troost en zijne werken (Arnhem 1873);

=== Editions of surveys ===
- Werken. Deel 1: Zijn er zoo? (1899)
- Werken. Deel 2: Zoo zijn er! Jeugd (1899)
- Werken. Deel 3: Zie daar! Scherts en Ernst (1899)
- Werken. Deel 4. Denkende beeldjes. Eerste en laatste studenten-schetsen (1900)
- Werken. Deel 5. Afspiegelingen. Ze zijn er! (1900)
- Het dagboek van Alexander Ver Huell 1860 - 1865 (1985)

=== Contributions to other publications ===
- Alexander Ver Huell (1886). "Wolter Zimmers, een Geldersche Dichter uit de XVIIde en XVIIIde Eeuw. door Mr. A. Ver Huell". Geldersche Volksalmanak voor Het Jaar 1886 (in Dutch): 75–93.
- Alexander Ver Huell (1982). "No. 470, Hoogewoerd". De Revisor (in Dutch). 9: 37–40.

== Sources ==
- Blok, P. J.; Molhuysen, P. C., eds. (1914). "Ver Huell, Jhr. Mr. Alexander Willem Maurits Carel". Nieuw Nederlandsch Biografisch Woordenboek. Deel 3 (DNBL) (in Dutch). Sijthoff. pp. 1286–1287.
- F. Jos. van den Branden; J. G. Frederiks, eds. (1888–1891). "Jhr. mr. Alexander Willem Maurits Carel Ver Huell". Biographisch woordenboek der Noord- en Zuidnederlandsche letterkunde (DBNL) (in Dutch). p. 818.
