= Duurstede =

Duurstede may refer to:

- Dorestad, the major early medieval trading centre
- Duurstede Castle, the late medieval castle there
- Wijk bij Duurstede, the modern-day town, named after the former
- Fort Duurstede, a 17th-century Dutch fortress in Indonesia
- Duurstede (restaurant), a now defunct restaurant
