= Herman Asaribab =

Indonesian military officer (1964–2020)

Lieutenant General (Ret.) Herman Asaribab
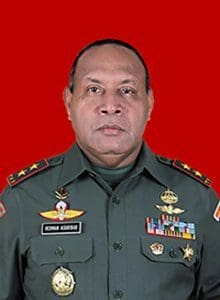
- Herman Asaribab
- Born: 10 June 1964; Jayapura, West Irian, Indonesia
- Died: 14 December 2020 (aged 56); Jakarta, Indonesia
- Spouse(s): Fransisca Diana Marga Pratiwi (m. 1995; died 2005) Mudi Yunita Bukit (m. 2011)
- Military career
- Allegiance: Indonesia
- Branch: Indonesian Army
- Service years: 1988–2020
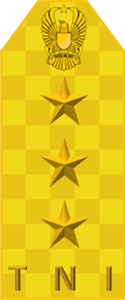
- Rank: Lieutenant General
- Service number: 32262
- Unit: Infantry
- Commands: 751st Infantry Battalion; East Jakarta Military District; 20th Infantry Brigade; Military Resort 172/Praja Wira Yakthi; 12th Military Regional Command/Tanjungpura; 17th Military Regional Command/Cenderawasih

Lieutenant General (Ret.) Herman Asaribab (10 June 1964 – 14 December 2020) was an Indonesian military officer. He served as the Commander of the 17th Military Regional Command/Cenderawasih from August 2019 to November 2020, before being promoted to Vice Chief of Staff of the Indonesian Army.

== Early life and education ==
Herman Asaribab was born on 10 June 1964 in Jayapura, the capital of the newly established province of West Irian. Both his mother and father came from the Biak Numfor tribe. He began his education at the elementary school owned by the YPK Senasaba (Senaba Christian Education Foundation) in Jayapura and graduated in 1977. He then continued to the 2nd State Junior High School in Jayapura, which he graduated in 1981, and to the 414th State High School in Abepura, which he graduated in 1984.

During his military career, Asaribab enrolled at the Sunan Giri University, a university owned by Nahdlatul Ulama. He entered the university in 1992 and graduated in June 1995 with a social studies degree (S.Sos).

== Military career ==
=== Military education ===
In 1985, Asaribab enrolled at the Indonesian Military Academy in Magelang. He graduated from the academy in 1988, and was inaugurated as a first lieutenant by President Suharto on 26 July 1988. After that, Asaribab enrolled in several other military education programs, such as the General Course for Infantry from 1988 until 1989, Advanced Officers Course in 1993 and 1998, the Indonesian Army Command and General Staff College in 2000, and the Indonesian National Armed Forces Command and General Staff College in 2003.

=== Officer commands ===
Asaribab was first deployed in Kediri, where he became the commander of a platoon in the 521st Infantry Battalion. He held the position from 1989 until 1992, and was transferred to the position of the escort company commander of the 5th Military Regional Command/Brawijaya. He was transferred again in 1995, when he was stationed in the 527th Infantry Battalion at Lumajang. His unit served in East Timor between 1990 until 1996.

After he graduated from the Advanced Officers Course in 1998, Asaribab moved to Ambon, where he became the Deputy Commander of the 731st Infantry Battalion until 2000. For several months, Asaribab was stationed at the 16th Military Regional Command/Pattimura, where he became the acting Assistant Officer for Training Affairs in the command. He was named Chief of Staff of the Ambon Military District for a short period until he was transferred back to Bandung.

In Bandung, Asaribab was put in charge of the information affairs in the Indonesian Army Command and General Staff College. In the same year, he was reassigned and was put in charge of security affairs in the college. After he finished his education in 2003, Asaribab was stationed back in Papua, where he served as the Assistant Officer for Intelligence Affairs in the 17th Military Regional Command/Cenderawasih from 2004 until 2005. In 2005, Asaribab became the commander of the 751st Infantry Battalion in the regional command.

In 2007, Asaribab moved to Jakarta, where he became the Commander of the Non-Commissioned Officer Academy in the Jayakarta Military Regional Command. He held the office until 2008 when he became the Commander of the East Jakarta Military District. Asaribab was stationed at the Indonesian Army HQ in 2009 in which he became an employed military officer to the personal affairs of the Indonesian Army.

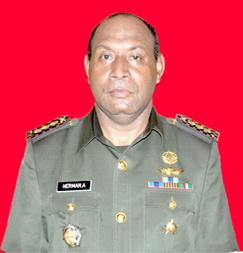
Colonel Herman Asaribab, Commander of the Military Resort 172/Praja Wira Yakthi

After a few years in Jakarta, Asaribab returned to his hometown, Jayapura, in 2010, where he became the Commander of the 20th Infantry Brigade. He was stationed in Bandung to serve as the Director of Firearms Education at the Infantry Arms Center from 2011 until 2013. He returned to the Cenderawasih MRC in 2013 to serve as the Commander of the Praja Wira Yakthi Military Resort.

During his tenure as the Commander of the Praja Wira Yakthi Military Resort, the Governor of Papua, Lukas Enembe, pledged financial support to send Asaribab to the United States Army Command and General Staff College, the same college that Susilo Bambang Yudhoyono had attended. Enembe later stated that his intention was to support Papuans to become general officers in the Indonesian military and police.

=== Flag officer commands ===
On 4 March 2015, Asaribab was promoted from colonel to brigadier general, making him the second Papuan to become a flag officer in the Indonesian Army. In his capacity as a brigadier general, Asaribab held the office of Deputy Commander of the Infantry Arms Center. He held the office for a few months, as on the same year he was transferred to serve as the Deputy Commander of the Indonesian Army Command and General Staff College.

On 10 September 2015, Asaribab replaced Brigadier General Tatang Sulaiman as the Chief of Staff of the Cenderawasih Regional Military Command. Asaribab was transferred back to Jakarta on 4 December 2017, when he became the expert staff for the Chief of Staff of the Indonesian Army on Human Resources and Development. In 2018, Asaribab was promoted to Major General, and was entrusted to assist the Chief of Staff of the Indonesian Army as a special staff.

On 25 March 2019, Asaribab replaced Achmad Supriyadi as the Commander of the 12th Regional Military Command/Tanjungpura. He left the post on 7 December 2019 when he was replaced by Muhammad Nur Rahmad.

On 30 August 2019, the Commander of the Indonesian Armed Forces Hadi Tjahjanto officially appointed Asaribab as the commander of the 17th Military Regional Command/Cenderawasih. According to Head of the Information Center of the Armed Forces Sisriadi, Asaribab's appointment as the commander was part of a cultural approach to resolve the 2019 Papua protests. Asaribab was inaugurated into office on 17 September 2019, replacing Major General Yosua Pandit Sembiring.

On 18 November 2020, Tjahjanto appointed Asaribab as the Deputy Chief of Staff of the Indonesian Army. In relation to his office, Asaribab was promoted to Lieutenant General on 8 December 2020. Although he de jure had held the office, he was never inaugurated into the office, and Lieutenant General Mochammad Fachruddin remained the de facto Deputy Chief of Staff, as Asaribab pursued medical treatments.

== Death ==
Asaribab died on 14 December 2020. He had been treated at Gatot Soebroto Army Hospital since the time of his appointment as the Deputy Chief of Staff of the Indonesian Army. Doctors stated that illness had caused Asaribab's death, but did not immediately specify a condition.

Asaribab was planned to be buried in Jayapura. On the night of his death, his body was flown from the Soekarno–Hatta International Airport, and arrived at Theys Hiyo Eluay Airport, Jayapura, on the morning of 15 December 2020. The casket was welcomed by the Police Chief of Papua, Commander of the 17th Military Regional Command/Cenderawasih, and several other Papuan officials. The regional secretary of Papua, Doren Wakerkwa, requested that the Papuan populace fly the flag at half-mast in honor of Asaribab.

The Kompas newspaper, Indonesia's newspaper of record, listed Asaribab's death as one of the most popular news nationally.

== Personal life ==
Asaribab married Francisca Diana Marga Pratiwi in 1995. The marriage resulted in three children, namely Bernadethe Yuliana Asaribab, Immaculhata Selinida Asaribab, and Agnes Dormina Asaribab. Pratiwi died on 23 October 2005.

Asaribab remarried on 19 February 2011 to Mudi Yunita Bukit. The marriage resulted in no children.

Asaribab was a Christian.
