= Matulessy =

Matulessy is a Moluccan surname. Notable people with the surname include:

- Reza Rahadian Matulessy (born 1987), Indonesian actor, model, singer, and director.
- Roldiah Matulessy (1925–2009), Indonesian actress and singer.
- Thomas Matulessy (1783–1814), Indonesian National Hero.
