= Paperu =

Coordinates: 3°35′S 128°40′E

Paperu, Indonesia, is a village on the island of Saparua, which is a part of the Ambon island group in the Maluku Islands.
