= Fort Victoria (Ambon) =

Portuguese fort in Ambon, Indonesia

Coordinates: 3°41′30″S 128°10′56″E

Fort Nieuw Victoria
- Nossa Senhora de Anunciada
- Ambon, Maluku, Indonesia
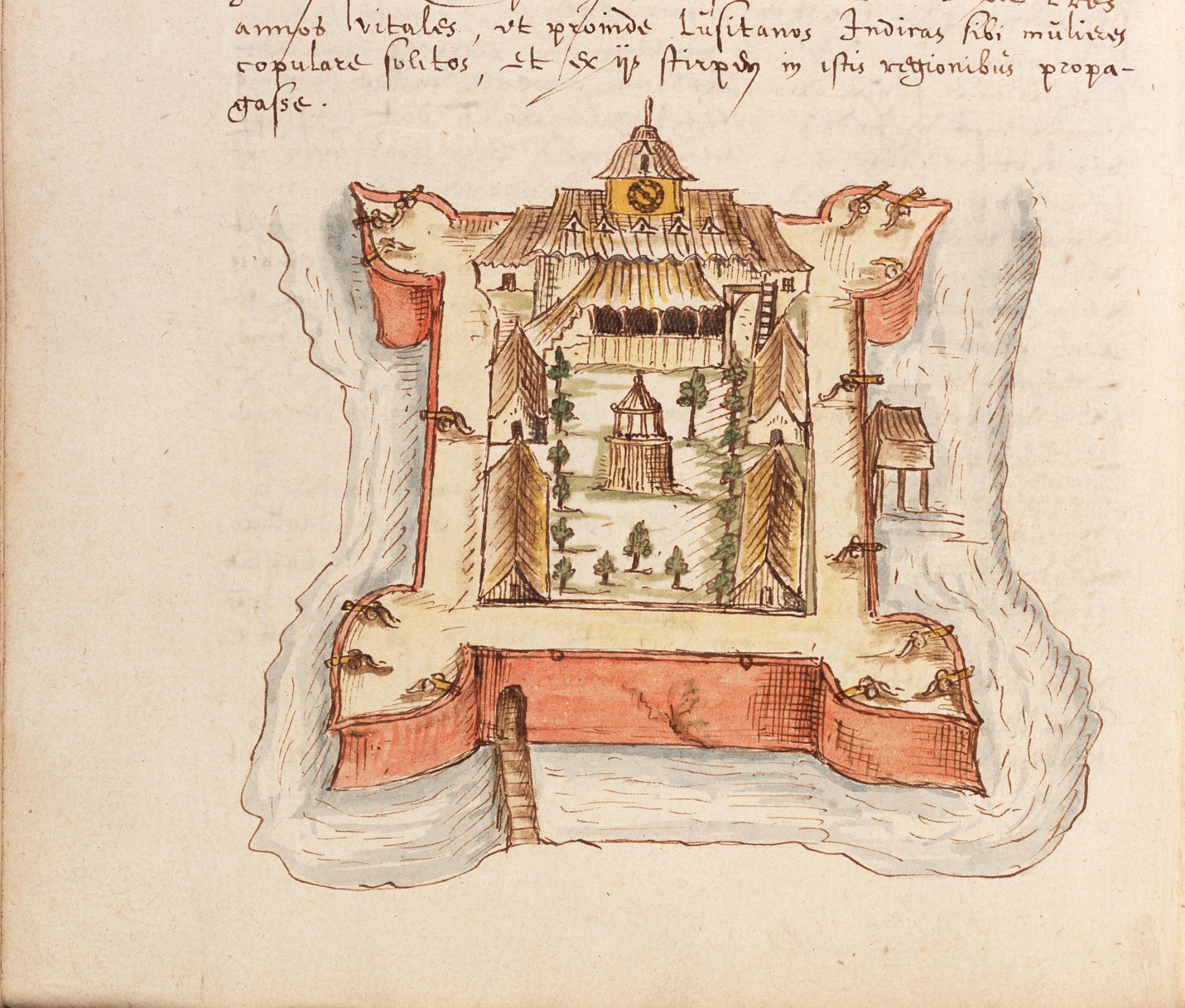
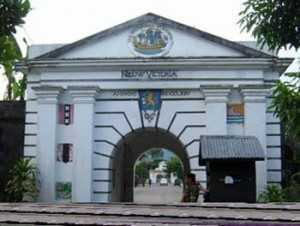
- Top: Bird's eye view of Fort Victoria, Ambon in the 17th century. Bottom: Fort Victoria

Site information
- Type: Military headquarters registered as Indonesian National Cultural Heritage Site
- Owner: Indonesian National Armed Forces
- Operator: Kodam XVI/Pattimura
- Controlled by: Indonesian National Army
- Website: ambon.go.id/benteng-victoria/

Site history
- Built: 1575
- Built by: Portuguese Empire
- In use: 1575–present
- Battles/wars: Portuguese–Ternate wars Pattimura rebellion Invasion of Ambon

Garrison information
- Current commander: Maj.Gen. Ruruh Aris Setyawibawa
- Garrison: Kodam XVI/Pattimura

Fort Victoria (Indonesian: Benteng Victoria; From Dutch: Fort Nieuw Victoria and also known in its original Portuguese name, Portuguese: Forte de Nossa Senhora da Anunciada de Amboíno) is one of former Portuguese forts located in Sirimau District, the center of Ambon City and became the oldest fort in the city. It was built by the Portuguese in 1575, but was later taken over by the Dutch. The fort is one of the tourist attractions on Ambon Island and currently serves as the headquarter of the Pattimura Military Command.

The status of the fort had been listed as one of Indonesia's national cultural heritage sites since 2017 by the Ambon provincial government.

== History ==
During colonial rule, the fort of Kota Laha was taken over by the Dutch from the Portuguese and changed its name to Fort Victoria. Previously, the Portuguese built and named the fort Nossa Senhora de Anunciada in 1575 and was finished in 1580 by a Portuguese governor Gaspar de Mello, the fort was captured by the Dutch in 1605 and later renamed it as Victoria, which means victory. The fort was severely damaged by a major earthquake that shook Ambon around 1754. After being renovated the fort was renamed Nieuw Victoria which means new victory. The Dutch used the place as the center of government, defense, and the army's formation. In this fort, Kapitan Pattimura was hanged by the Dutch on December 6, 1817. The fort also once saw the Invasion of Ambon by the Indonesian army against the separatist South Moluccan Republic in 1950.

== Construction and architecture ==
Fort Victoria has rooms with their own functions. Its function is as a place to organize strategies and a place to store foodstuffs. In front of the fort, there's a harbor that was used as a connecting route for ships between islands. Through the harbor, the Dutch could transport spices to be distributed to Europe. The road in front of the fort that is located near Honipopu Beach is called Victoria Boulevard. Giant cannons could be found in the fort, as well as carved statues made of wood, maps of the enlargement of Ambon City from the 17th to 19th centuries, as well as a collection of paintings of Dutch Administrators in Maluku that could be found in some rooms.
