= Haria, Saparua =

Villages on the island of Saparua, Indonesia

Coordinates: 3°35′S 128°37′E

- Interactive map of Haria, Saparua
- Country: Indonesia
- Province: Maluku

Area
  - Total: 10 km^{2} (3.9 sq mi)

Population
  - Estimate (2010): 10,000

Haria (traditionally called Leawaka Amalatu) is one of the 17 villages on the island of Saparua, Maluku, Indonesia.

== Pela relationships ==
Haria has a pela (traditional village connection) with the following villages:

- Waesamu
- Hative Besar
- Lilibooi
- Sirisori

- Bongso : Paperu

== Important people ==
- Pattimura/Kapitan Thomas Matulessy, one of the Indonesian heroes who helped to fight for independence.
