= Pattimura =

National hero of Indonesia

Thomas Matulessy
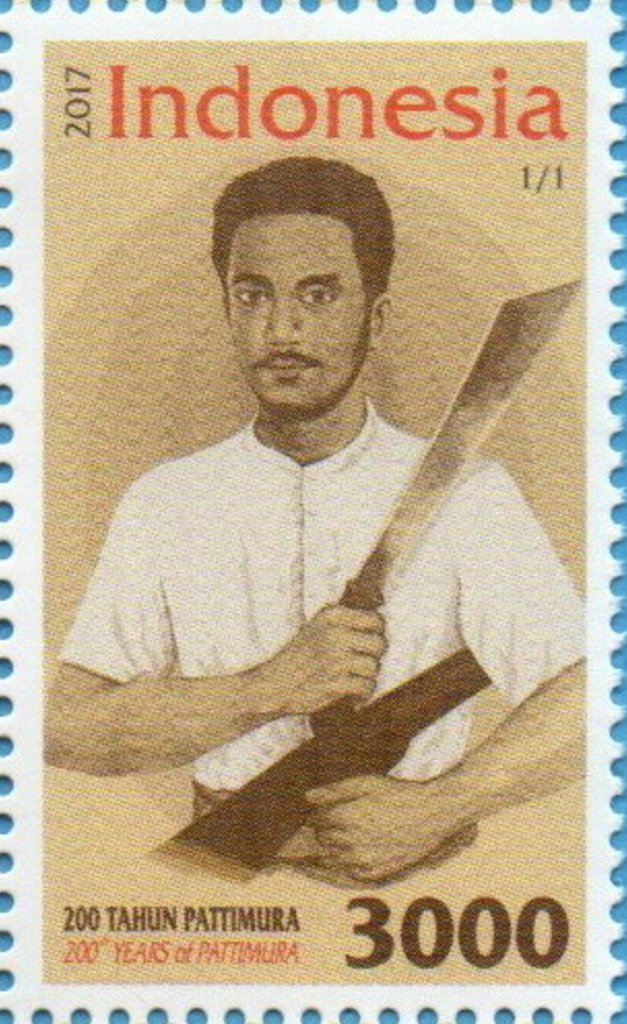
- Bicentenary of Pattimura Anti Dutch Resistance Leader
- Born: 8 June 1783; Haria, Saparua, Maluku, Dutch East Indies
- Died: 16 December 1817 (aged 34); Nieuw Victoria, Ambon, Maluku, Dutch East Indies
- Military career
- Allegiance: East India Company
- Branch: British Colonial Auxiliary Forces
- Rank: Sergeant major
- Nickname: Pattimura
- Conflicts: Pattimura War
- Awards: National Hero of Indonesia

Thomas Matulessy (8 June 1783 – 16 December 1817), also known as Kapitan Pattimura or simply Pattimura, was a famous Ambonese soldier who became a symbol of both the Maluku and Indonesian struggle for independence, declared a national hero by President Suharto on 6 November 1973.

== Origins ==
Thomas Matulessy was born on 8 June 1783, in Negeri Haria 'Leawaka Amapati'. The ancestors of the Matulessy family originated from Negeri Itawaka, after which some settled in Negeri Ullath and others in Negeri Haria.

One family member who settled in Negeri Haria was Frans Matulessy. He married Fransina Silahooy, originally from Negeri Siri Sori Kristen, who was the mother of Yohannes and Thomas Matulessy. "The Matulessy family was Protestant Christian; the names Yohannes and Thomas were taken from the Bible."

== Personal life and military career ==
Thomas Matulessy remained unmarried throughout his life, though he had a partner named Elisabeth Gassier, a woman of mixed British-Moluccan descent. His lineage was continued by his older brother, Yohannes, whose descendants, including Frans Matulessy (Bung Angky), still preserve Thomas Matulessy heritage, house, and traditional weapons (Parang Salawaku) in Negeri Haria.

Thomas Matulessy professional journey began in 1810 when he joined the British Army in Ambon. He was part of the British Amboina Corps, an elite unit formed under the authority of the East India Company (EIC) and Thomas Stamford Raffles to defend Maluku against French-Dutch alliances.

Known for his discipline, leadership, and exceptional marksmanship, Thomas Matulessy quickly rose through the ranks to become a Sergeant Major. He served for approximately seven years until 1816, when the London Convention forced Britain to return Maluku to Dutch control.

== The war of Thomas Matulessy (1817) ==
=== The Return of the Dutch in Maluku triggers popular resentment ===
Britain occupied the Dutch East Indies from 1811 to 1816, with Sir Thomas Stamford Raffles serving as Lieutenant Governor. However, changes in the European political landscape following the defeat in the Napoleonic Wars triggered the London Convention on 13 August 1814. This treaty was signed in London by Robert Stewart, Viscount Castlereagh, representing Britain, and Hendrik Fagel, representing the Netherlands. Based on the agreement, Britain agreed to return the Dutch East Indies to the Kingdom of the Netherlands to strengthen Dutch economic and political stability in Europe.

The restitution process was fully realized on 19 August 1816, in Batavia. Britain was represented by Raffles' successor, John Fendall, while the Dutch were represented by three Commissioners-General: Cornelis Theodorus Elout, Godert van der Capellen, and Arnold Adriaan Buyskes.

Specifically for the Moluccas, the transfer of power took place on 25 March 1817, at Fort Victoria, Ambon City. The administration of the Moluccas was handed over by the British Resident, William Byam Martin, to Nicolaas Engelhard (Chairman of the Moluccas Transfer Commission) and the new Dutch Governor, Jacobus Ariën van Middelkoop.

Subsequently, at Fort Victoria, Nicolaas Engelhard inaugurated Johannes Rudolph van den Berg, a 28 year old Resident, to his post at Fort Duurstede in Saparua. He was accompanied by his 26 year old wife, Johana Christina Umbgrove, and their three young children: the eldest son Jean Lubert (5), the second child Gerardus (3), and the youngest, Rudolph (1).

Three Dutch ships dropped anchor in Ambon Bay: the Evertsen, commanded by Lieutenant Quirijn Maurits Rudolph Ver Huell (replacing Captain Nicolaas Hermanus Dietz who died on 20 March 1817); the Nassau, under Captain Sloterdijk; and the Maria Reigersbergen, under Lieutenant Groot.

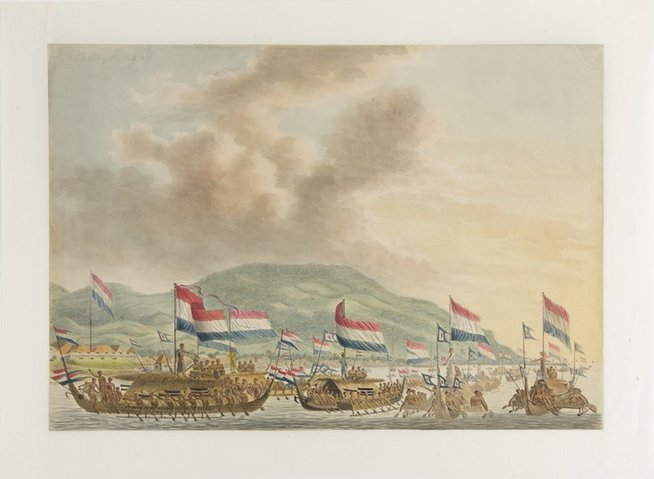
The Hongi Kora-kora fleet sent from Ternate and Tidore to Ambon to enforce the monopoly on the clove and nutmeg trade. Artwork by Quirijn Maurits Rudolph Ver Huell, 1817.

Following the British transfer of power in 1816, the Dutch government imposed harsh exploitative policies such as forced labor, land taxes, and the destructive Extirpation of spice trees to recover from their national debt. These burdens were further compounded by the violation of the 1814 London Convention, as the Dutch forcibly recruited former British Amboina Corps soldiers into the KNIL instead of granting them the promised freedom of choice.

This systematic injustice, coupled with the return of a brutal monopoly, ignited widespread fury across Maluku, famously captured in local oral protests (Pantung) that decried how the people's hard labor only served to enrich their oppressors.

This resentment drove the people to mobilize the former capitans of the British Amboina Corps from Ambon to Saparua Island. They chose Mount Saniri as their strategic assembly point due to its location in Siri Sori Kristen, which offered a vast, elevated vantage point to monitor Dutch troop movements at Fort Duurstede.

In a solemn traditional ceremony attended by kings and elders from Ambon, Haruku, Nusalaut, Seram, and Saparua, Thomas Matulessy was formally appointed as the Supreme War Commander. Together, they finalized a strategic assault on Fort Duurstede a stronghold perched on a 20-meter limestone cliff overlooking the sea targeting the entire garrison and the residence of the young Resident, Johannes Rudolph van den Berg.

=== The inauguration script of Thomas Matulessy as Kapitan Pattimura ===
On Wednesday, 14 May 1817, this inauguration took place during a special meeting held in the afternoon by the Staff of Saniri Tiga Batang Air (Eti, Tala, and Sapalewa) along with the captains of Lease.

The event occurred in the Sasawoni Forest, on the border of Porto and Haria, after Thomas Matulessy was chosen and elected by acclamation. The inauguration was performed by the General Chairperson of Saniri Tiga Batang Air, specifically the "Inama/Raja Sahulau" named "Sahune Sahulau," witnessed by the meeting participants.

By drawing his sacred machete (parang sakti) from its sheath and placing it upon Thomas Matulessy's forehead, he uttered these words:

Oo; Lanite Tapile Dabite Tuwale; In the name of God, the Creator of Heaven and Earth, in the name of the ancestors and the elders, and for the sake of the motherland. From this moment forth, I appoint Thomas Matulessy as Captain with the title Kapitan Pattimura, meaning: "The King of Justice." His commands must be obeyed, and let no one defy him.

=== Secret meeting at Mount Saniri ===
After the inauguration procession of Thomas Matulessy as Kapitan Pattimura concluded in the afternoon, the kings and captains continued their agenda by holding a secret meeting at Mount Saniri that night. The purpose of this meeting was to devise a strategy for the attack on Fort Duurstede. During this gathering, the Captains from the islands of Ambon, Haruku, Nusalaut, and Seram solidified their oath of loyalty and accepted the mandate under the leadership of Thomas Matulessy to lead the resistance in their respective regions. The inauguration was accompanied by a vow of struggle as follows:

In the Name of the Three Entities, in the name of our ancestors, in the name of the Jou-Jou Patih/Latu and our motherland, I swear on behalf of the Captains of all Maluku. Eradicate the colonizers who seek to occupy the land bestowed by the Almighty Three Entities upon our elders and ancestors. Therefore, we must fight to uphold justice and truth. Do not retreat; maintain your courage, O all Captains, and if we fail, our children and grandchildren unto the seventh generation shall continue this struggle. Amen.

Following the inauguration, Thomas Matulessy immediately appointed several captains and representatives from Saparua to lead and mobilize the people in every village (negeri). This great force was prepared to storm Fort Duurstede the following day, Thursday, 15 May 1817. These figures included: Yohannes Matulessy from Haria, Kapitan Wattimury (Kakirussi) from Porto, Kapitan Sayyid Perintah from Siri-Sori Islam, Anthone Rhebok, and the youth Titaley from Saparua. Other involved figures included the brothers from Tiouw; Philips Latumahina along with his brother, Lukas Latumahina from Paperu; Lucas Selanno from Nolloth; Lukas Lisapaly (Aron Lisapaly) from Ihamahu; as well as Kapitan Nanulaitta and Hehanussa from Booi.

=== 15 May 1817: Battle of Fort Duurstede ===
On 15 May 1817, the rebels seized the Fort Duurstede and killed A total of 40 victims, including the Resident of Saparua, Johannes Rudolph van den Berg, his wife Johanna Christina Umbgrove and their two children Gerardus van den Berg and the youngest Rudolph van den Berg, 1 administrator, 17 soldiers consisting of European and native troops, along with 18 local workers at Fort Duurstede The only Dutch survivor was Jean Lubbert van den Berg van Saparua five-year-old son Jean Lubbert.

=== Jean Lubbert van den Berg ===
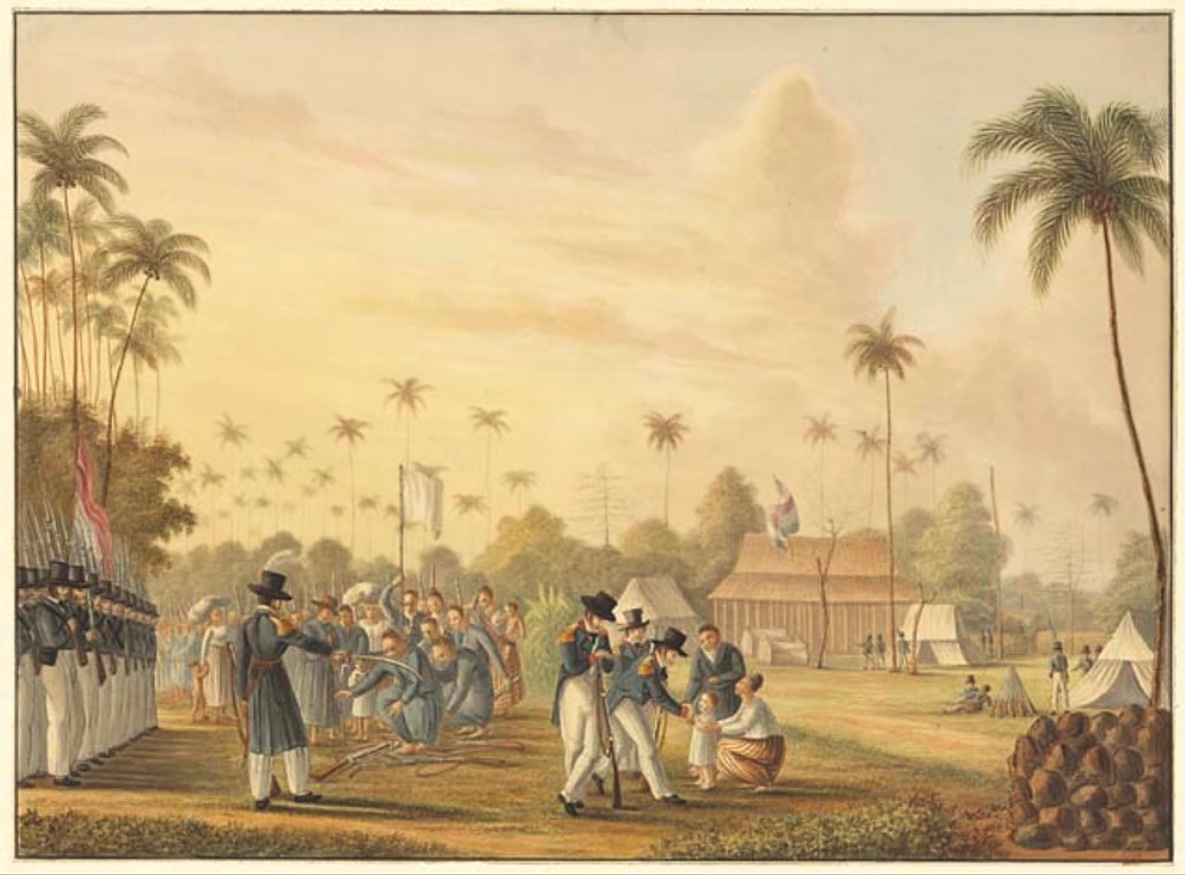
Jean Lubbert van den Berg was handed over by a local man, one of Pattimura's followers, and Maria Pattiwael to the Naval Lieutenant,Quirijn Maurits Rudolph Ver Huell 1817.

Jean Lubbert van den Berg, the Resident's five-year-old eldest son, was the only Dutch survivor. Residents found him inside Fort Duurstede on Friday, 16 May 1817, while they were about to bury the victims' bodies. The Resident's son was discovered hiding behind a pile of rice in a state of extreme terror with a bleeding ear, which had been severed by a sword; the residents found him after hearing the sound of crying inside the rice granary.

News of the boy's discovery was immediately conveyed to Thomas Matulessy. Although many in the crowd wanted the child killed, Thomas Matulessy wanted Jean to stay alive and entrusted him to Arnold Pattiwael, who then handed him over to his brother, Salomon Pattiwael (who later became the King of Tiouw).

'After the war ends, this child will be known as Jean Lubbert van den Berg van Saparua and will be returned to his family through the Captain of the Eversten, Q.M.R. Ver Huell,' Thomas Matulessy said to Salomon Pattiwael.

When Jean Lubbert was handed over to Salomon Pattiwael, at the request of Salomon and his wife, the Resident's son was immediately hidden in the Rila Forest, Saparua. During his time in hiding, Jean Lubbert was nurtured and cared for by Maria Pattiwael, Salomon Pattiwael's daughter, before eventually being handed over to Naval Lieutenant Q. M. R. Ver Huell.

=== Major Beetjes's expedition at Waisisil Beach ===
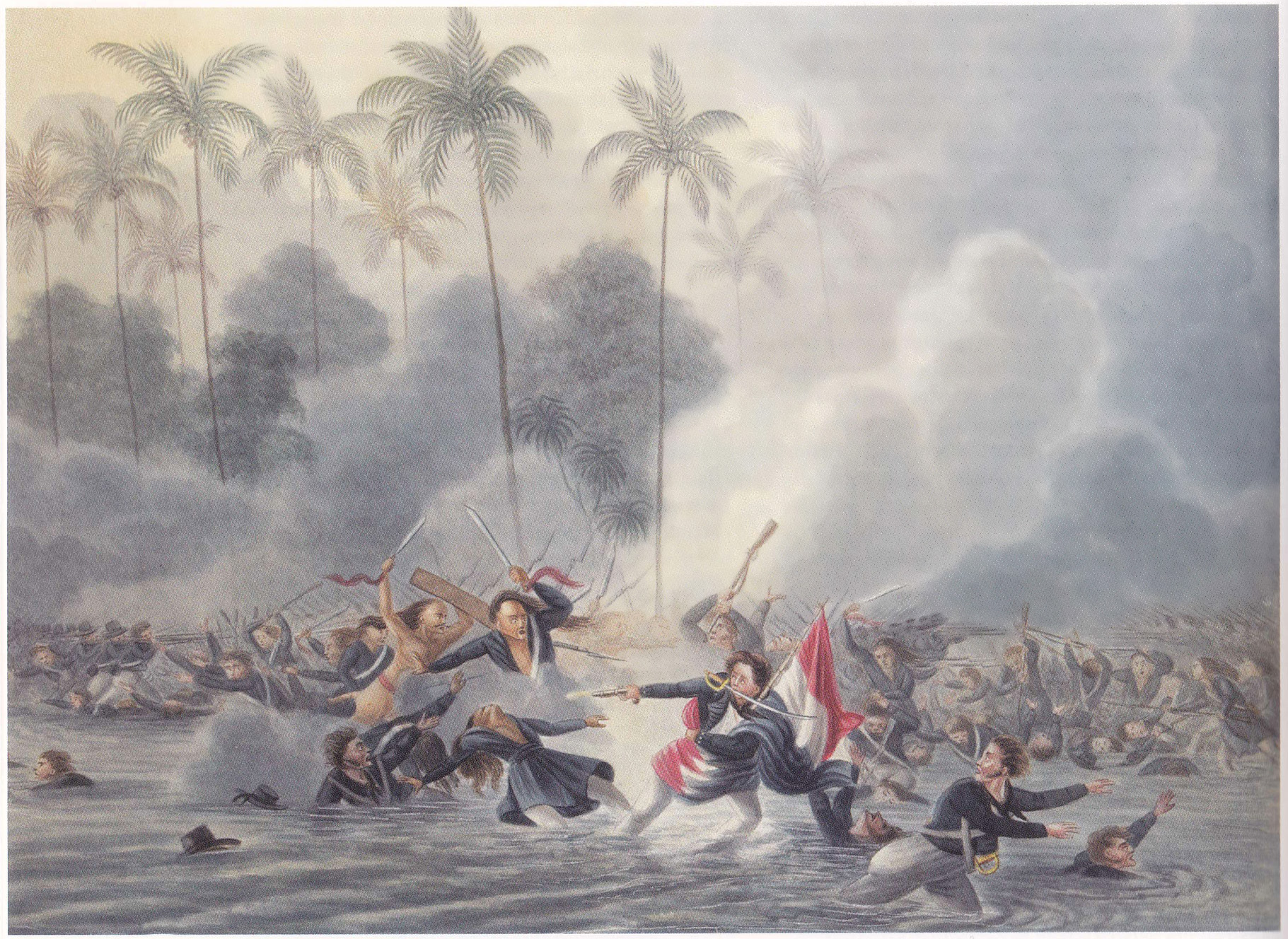
Illustration of the Battle of Waisisil Beach (1817): Depicting the pincer tactics employed by the forces of Thomas Matulessy and Philips Latumahina. After showering the enemy with gunfire from behind the mangrove forest, the warriors stormed the coast to wipe out Major Beetjes' remaining soldiers in close-quarters combat. Work of.Quirijn Maurits Rudolph Ver Huell.

After the seizure, Pattimura's forces defended the fort and on 20 May defeated and killed Major Beetjes, Second Lieutenant E. S. de Haas, As detailed by Ben van Kaam in his book, Ambon door de eeuwen (1977) in Baarn, Netherlands, Major Beetjes' expedition ended tragically.

Of the 300 personnel deployed, 241 were killed in two horrific stages of slaughter: the first 100 soldiers perished at sea due to cannon fire from Fort Duurstede, while the remaining 141 personnel, including Major Beetjes himself, were massacred on the shores of Waisisil Beach after being trapped by Pattimura's pincer strategy. Meanwhile, the 59 survivors immediately retreated to Haruku Island, Negeri Suli, and Ambon.

The brilliant victory of Thomas Matulessy's forces instantly ignited the spirit of resistance among the Moluccan people across almost the entire spice islands. With burning enthusiasm, Thomas Matulessy planned to hold a grand assembly at the Baileo Traditional House in Negeri Haria, scheduled for 29 May 1817, to solidify the unity of the people's leaders and to sign the Haria Proclamation and the Hatawano Grievances in opposition to Dutch rule.

On 29 May, Pattimura and other Maluku leaders made the Haria Proclamation, which outlined their grievances against the Dutch government and declared Pattimura to be the leader of the Maluku people. In response, Governor-General Van der Cappellen immediately fired the governor of Ambon, Jacobus A. van Middelkoop, and his right hand, Nicolaus Engelhard, for their abuses of the local people.

=== Siege of Fort Zeelandia ===
On 29 May 1817, Thomas Matulessy tasked Melchior Kesaulya with drafting two pivotal documents: the Hatawano Grievances, which listed the people's sufferings, and the Haria Proclamation, which contained a sacred oath of struggle to continue the assault on Fort Nieuw Zeelandia on Haruku Island.

These two documents were read before 21 Kings (Raja-Patih), the captains (Kapitan), and the citizens gathered at the Baileo traditional house in Negeri Haria, Saparua Island. This assembly was known as the 'Great Meeting' (rapat raksasa) as it was attended by thousands of people and customary leaders to witness the reading and signing of the documents. Finally, the manuscript was ratified by the signatures of 21 Raja-Patih as evidence of Moluccan unity.

Melchior Kesaulya was appointed by Thomas Matulessy as one of the commanders of the people's forces on Haruku Island to seize Fort Nieuw Zeelandia under the leadership of Kapitan Lukas Selanno, assisted by Kapitan Lukas Lisapaly, alias Kapitan Aron. Meanwhile, Abraham Hukom, the captain from Negeri Titawaay 'Lesinusa Amalatu', also incited resistance in the Haruku region.

On 1 June 1817, consecutive attacks were launched against Fort Nieuw Zeelandia, but these efforts failed as the Dutch garrison was reinforced by military aid from Ambon City. The Dutch soldiers, arriving with full military equipment, attacked and showered Pattimura's forces with bullets and cannons. Consequently, the siege failed, and Pattimura's forces were forced to retreat, while the Dutch position at Fort Nieuw Zeelandia grew even stronger.

=== Capture of Fort Duurstede ===
Two months later, on 3 August, Fort Duurstede was finally retaken by the Dutch, but the revolt had spread and was not subdued for another few months. The capture of Fort Duurstede was a moral victory and the entire island was still in the rebel's hand and also the counter-offensive victory of the Dutch

Due to betrayal from Booi's king, Pati Akoon, and Tuwanakotta, Pattimura was arrested on 12 November 1817 while he was in Booi. He and his fellows were sentenced to death. On 16 December 1817, Pattimura together with Anthone Rhebok, Philips Latumahina, Melchior Kesaulya and Said Parintah were hanged in front of Fort Nieuw Victoria in Ambon.

== The tribute to Kapitan Pattimura ==
=== The official conferment of Kapitan Pattimura as a national hero ===
Thomas Matulessy, famously known as Kapitan Pattimura, was officially designated as a National Hero of the Republic of Indonesia. On 6 November 1973, the Government of Indonesia, under the leadership of President Soeharto, conferred this title upon him through Presidential Decree No. 087/TK/1973.

=== Tributes to Kapitan Pattimura in public facilities and institutions ===
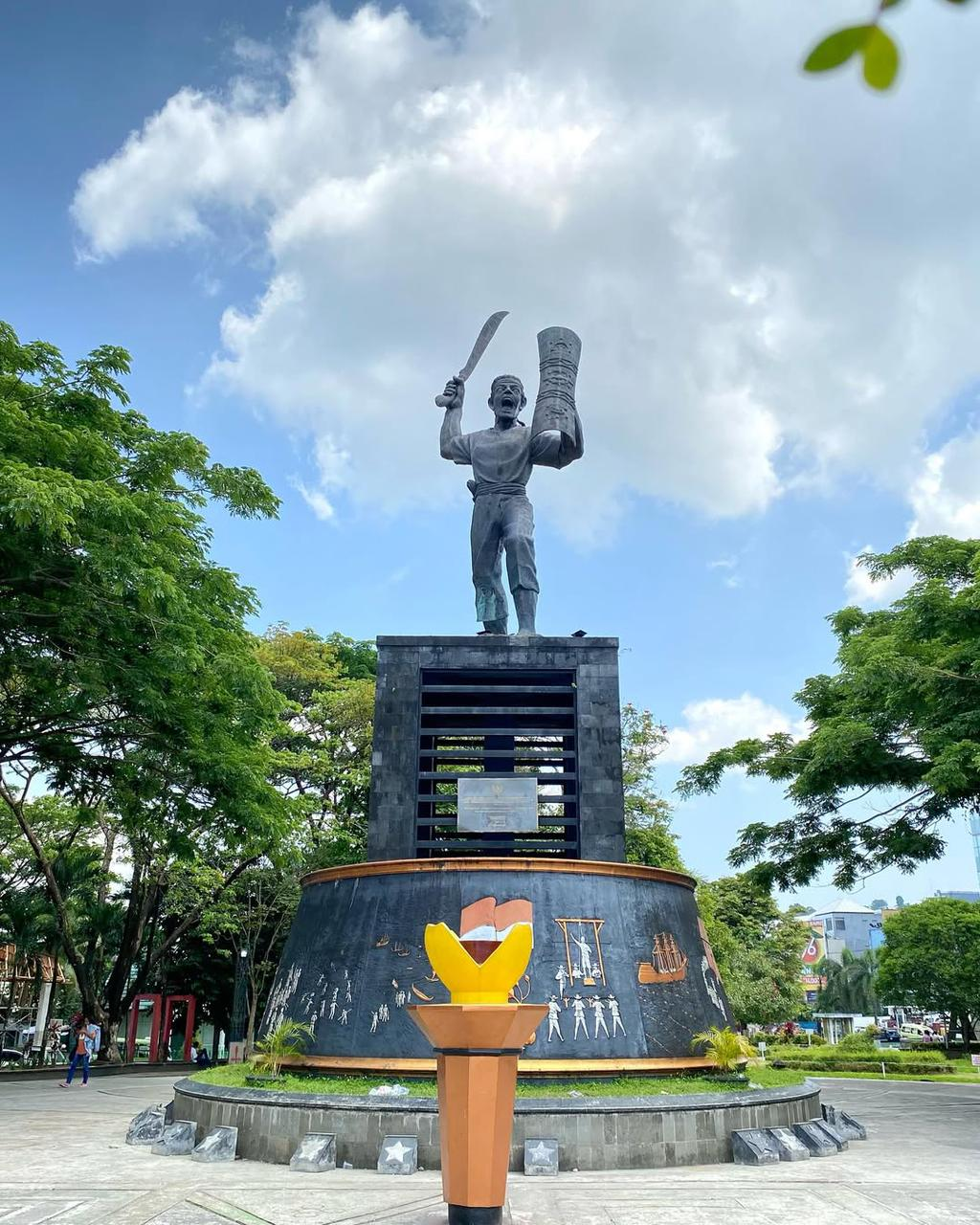
The Monument of Kapitan Pattimura (Thomas Matulessy) in Ambon City.

The honor bestowed upon Kapitan Pattimura is immortalized across various institutions and public facilities as a form of appreciation for his services. In the heart of Ambon City, lies Pattimura Park, which serves as both a green open space and a historical center. Standing majestically here is the new statue of Thomas Matulessy, the national hero titled Kapitan Pattimura, clutching a Parang Salawaku. This statue replaces the old one, which has since been moved to the Siwalima Museum area.

The Kapitan Pattimura Monument was built to commemorate 15 May 1817, which marked the beginning of Pattimura's resistance against the Dutch. Pattimura's name is now immortalized as the name of Pattimura University, Kodam XV/Pattimura (Regional Military Command), and Pattimura International Airport. Historically, the airport located in Negeri Laha was originally a Dutch military airbase called Vliegveld Laha (Laha Airbase), built by the Dutch Government in 1939.

After the Dutch administration ended, the base was handed over to the Indonesian Government and officially renamed Pattimura Airport to honor the Captain's service in fighting oppression. The figure of Thomas Matulessy also graced the Rp1,000 rupiah banknote (2000-2016 emissions). Bank Indonesia decision to include his face was a national effort to record the trail of the Moluccan struggle.

Additionally, his name is also assigned to the warship KRI Kapitan Pattimura (371), a corvette-type vessel that guards the sovereignty of the archipelago's seas. This tribute is not limited to Ambon; the name Pattimura is used for streets in various regions across Indonesia. Even in Wierden, Netherlands, there is a street in a Moluccan residential neighborhood named Pattimurastraat.

== Bibliography ==
- Aritonang, Jan; Steenbrink, Karel (2008). A History of Christianity in Indonesia. Studies in Christian mission. Vol. 35. Leiden: Brill. ISBN 978-1-109-18566-9.
- Cuhaj, George (2004). Standard Catalog of World Paper Money. Volume 3, Modern Issues 1961-Date. Iola: Krause Publications. ISBN 978-0-87349-800-5.
- Ajisaka, Arya; Damayanti, Dewi (2010). Mengenal Pahlawan Indonesia [Knowing Indonesian Heroes] (in Indonesian) (Revised ed.). Jakarta: Kawan Pustaka. ISBN 978-979-757-430-7.
- Lundry, Chris (2009). Separatism and State Cohesion in Eastern Indonesia. Ann Arbor: Arizona State University. ISBN 978-1-109-18566-9.
- Poesponegoro, Marwati Djoened; Notosusanto, Nugroho (1992). Sejarah Nasional Indonesia: Nusantara di Abad ke-18 dan ke-19 [Indonesia's National History: Nusantara in 18th and 19th Century] (in Indonesian). Vol. 4. Jakarta: Balai Pustaka. ISBN 978-979-407-410-7.
- Sudarmanto, J. B. (2007). Jejak-Jejak Pahlawan: Perekat Kesatuan Bangsa Indonesia [Footsteps of Heroes: Uniters of the Indonesian People] (in Indonesian). Jakarta: Gramedia Widiasarana Indonesia. ISBN 978-979-759-716-0.
