= Saparua =

Island in Maluku, Indonesia

Coordinates: 3.57493°S 128.647°E

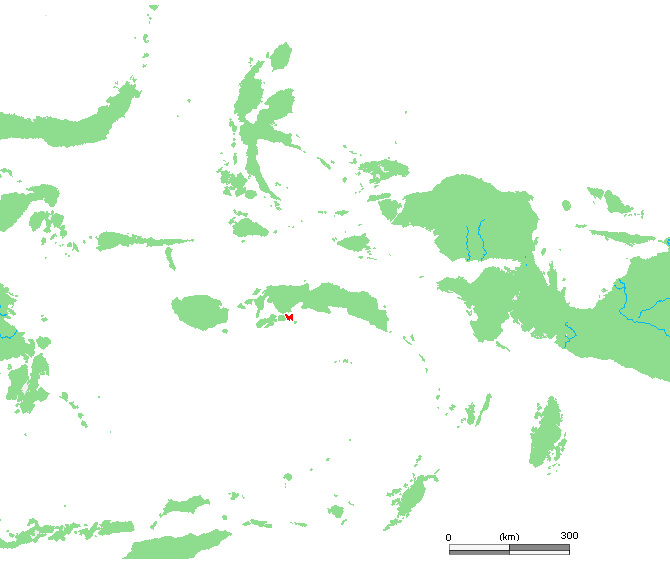
- Location of Saparua

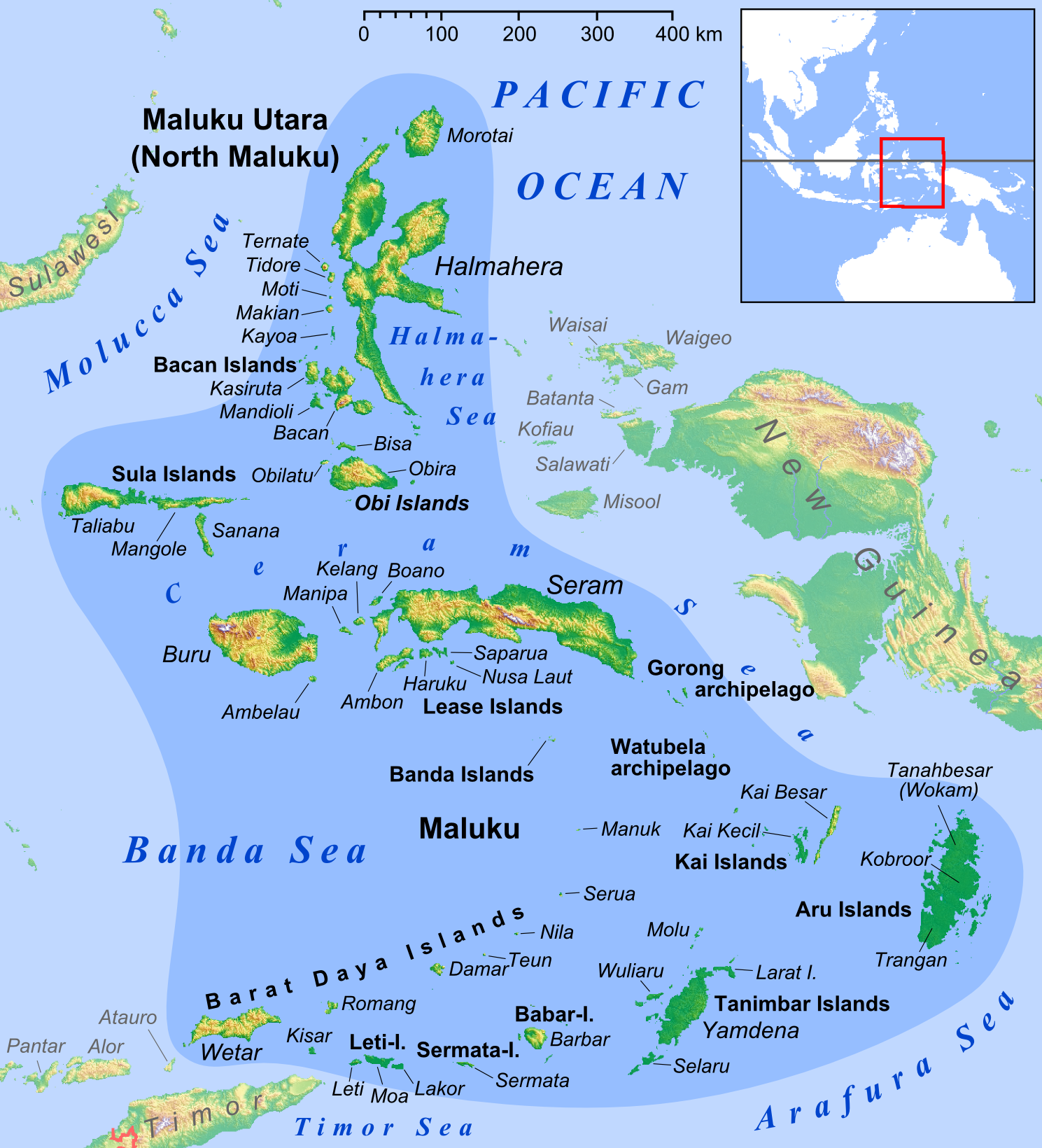
- Saparua is in the center of the map, just south of Seram.

Geography
- Location: South East Asia
- Archipelago: Maluku Islands
- Area: 168.1 km^{2} (64.9 sq mi)
- Highest elevation: 360 m (1180 ft)
- Highest point: Takuku

Administration
- Indonesia
- Province: Maluku
- Regency: Central Maluku

Demographics
- Population: 34,460 (mid 2023 estimate)
- Pop. density: 205.0/km^{2} (530.9/sq mi)

Saparua is an island east of Ambon Island in the Indonesian province of Maluku; the island of Haruku lies between Saparua and Ambon. The main port is in the south at Kota Saparua. The small and uninhabited island of Maolana is located near its southwestern side and Nusa Laut off its southeastern tip.

Saparua was administered as a single eponymous district (kecamatan) of Central Maluku Regency (Kabupaten Maluku Tengah), but in 2012 an additional district of East Saparua was formed from the eastern peninsula of the original district. Kota Saparua (Saparua town) is the administrative centre of the residual (western) district, while Tuhaha is the administrative centre of the new district.

The island (including Maolana island) covers a land area of 168.1 km^{2}, and had a population of 32,312 as of the 2010 census and 36,022 at the 2020 Census; the official estimate as at mid 2023 was 34,480. The inhabitants of Saparua speak the Saparua language, while Indonesian and Ambonese Malay are also spoken.

Saparua was the location of Indonesian national hero, Pattimura's rebellion against Dutch forces in 1817. It was also the birthplace of Gerrit Augustinus Siwabessy, a prominent politician who was Indonesia's Minister of Health during the 1960s and 1970s.

== Villages on Saparua ==
There are 17 administrative villages, listed below with their populations at the 2020 Census; ten comprise the new district of East Saparua, while seven remain with the residual Saparua District in the west of the island. The areas (in km^{2}) and 2020 Census populations of each of these, together with the official estimates as at mid 2023, are as follows:

Kode Wilayah	Name of desa	Area in km^{2}	Pop'n Census 2020	Pop'n Estimate mid 2023
81.01.12.2001	Booi	8.20	927	891
81.01.12.2002	Paperu	9.10	1,412	1,286
81.01.12.2003	Tiouw	7.90	1,484	1,359
81.01.12.2004	Haria	16.70	7,461	7,302
81.01.12.2005	Porto	23.50	2,808	2,670
81.01.12.2006	Kulur	6.50	1,112	1,085
81.01.12.2012	Saparua (village)	8.00	3,198	2,955
81.01.12	Totals Saparua District	79.90	18,402	17,548
81.01.26.2001	Ouw	9.50	1,680	1,549
81.01.26.2002	Ullath	6.80	1,591	1,534
81.01.26.2003	Siri-sori (Amapatti)	8.20	2,002	1,988
81.01.26.2004	Siri-sori Amalatu	18.00	2,251	2,170
81.01.26.2005	Mahu	6.55	718	698
81.01.26.2006	Tuhaha	13.30	2,379	2,339
81.01.26.2007	Ihamahu	12.10	1,509	1,503
81.01.26.2008	Iha	0.75	391	391
81.01.26.2009	Nolloth(-Titasomi)	11.20	3,038	2,858
81.01.26.2010	Itawaka	10.20	2,060	1,882
81.01.26	Totals Saparua Timur District	96.60	17,619	16,912

== Gallery ==
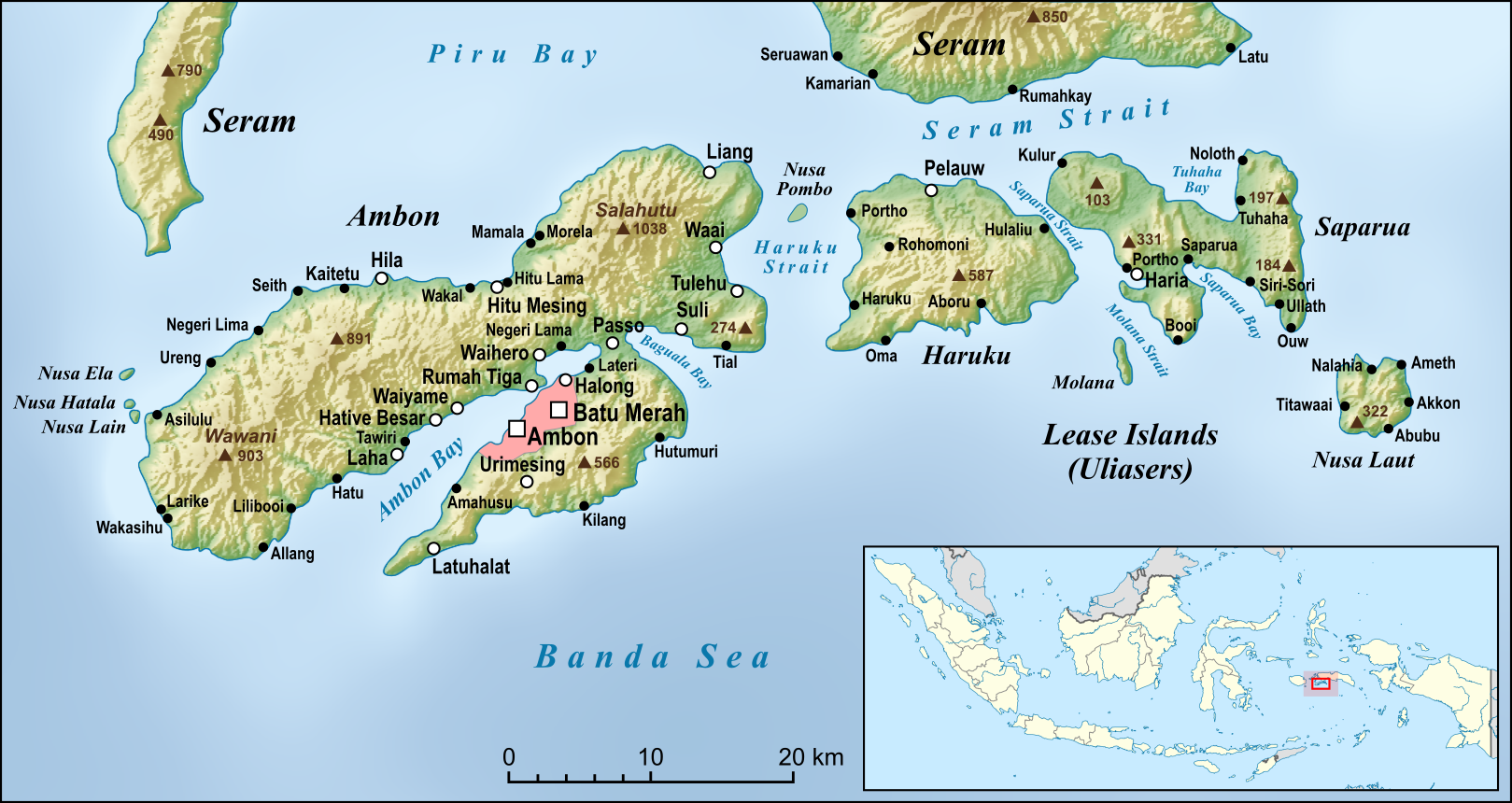
Saparua is in the right of the map, east of Haruku Island.

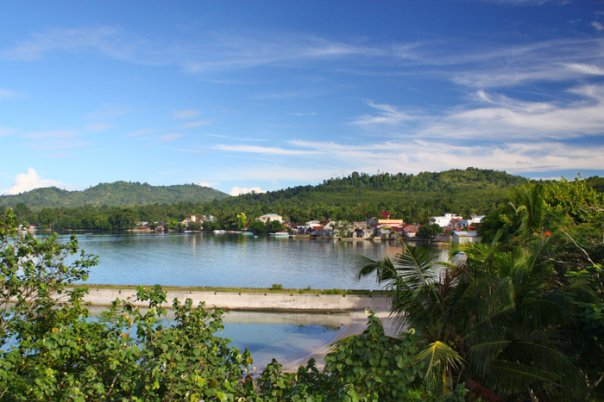
Kota Saparua from Fort Duurstede

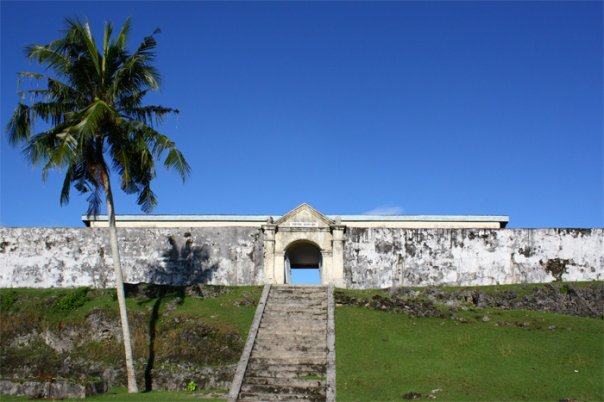
Fort Duurstede at Saparua

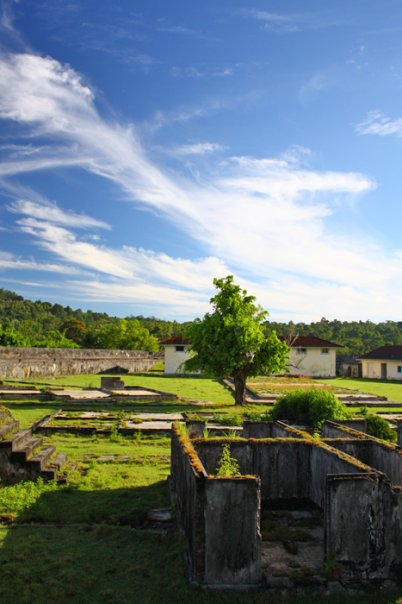
The inside of Fort Duurstede, Saparua
