= Duurstede (restaurant) =

Coordinates: 51°58′20.95″N 5°20′40.5″E

- Interactive map of Duurstede

Restaurant information
- Established: 1974
- Rating: Michelin Guide
- Location: Maleborduurstraat 7, Wijk bij Duurstede, 3961 BE, Netherlands

Restaurant Duurstede is a defunct restaurant in Wijk bij Duurstede, Netherlands. It was a fine dining restaurant that was awarded one Michelin star in 1977 and retained that rating until 1995.

De restaurant was founded in 1974 by head chef Paul Fagel. Fagel was more artist than businessman and went bankrupt. The Dutch Revenue Service seized the restaurant in 1993 and auctioned it off. The new owner leased it to Erik van Loo, who retained the stars till 1995.

The first Gault-Millau Guide mentioning Dutch restaurants, published in 1979, awarded Duurstede with 13 out of 20 points.

== See also ==
- List of Michelin starred restaurants in the Netherlands
