= Frans Jozef Peter van den Branden =

Belgian writer and archivist

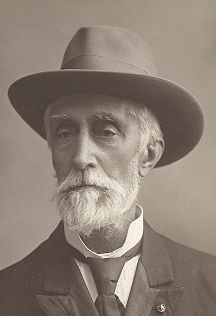

Frans Jozef Peter (F. Jos.) van den Branden (14 June 1837 – 22 March 1922) was a Belgian playwright, art historian, civil servant, educator and archivist. He wrote in the Dutch language. He is now known mainly for his art historical works, which mainly dealt with the history of the Antwerp school of artists and Antwerp poets and dramatists linked to the local chambers of rhetoric. He also co-authored the Biographisch woordenboek der Noord- en Zuidnederlandsche letterkunde with Johannes Godefridus Frederiks, a biographical dictionary of writers from the Netherlands and Belgium and their predecessor states.

== Life ==
Born in Antwerp, he lived from 1851 to 1855 in Brussels where he studied engineering. He then returned to Antwerp, where he worked as an engineer. In 1863 he became a civil servant of the municipal administration. He was also a secretary of De Olijftak, a chamber of rhetoric that traced its history back to the early 16th century in Antwerp. He started writing plays which were performed. In his comic one-act play 'with singing' with the title Spiritisme (Spiritism), which was performed by the Nationaal Theater (National Theatre) in 1864, he poked fun at the phenomenon of the proliferation of spiritist groups in Antwerp.

From 1865 onwards he taught Dutch diction at the city's music school. On 1 January 1869 he was appointed deputy archivist at the municipal archives, rising to chief archivist after Pieter Génard's retirement. He held the position until his retirement at the age of 75. He used his access to the city archives as the primary source for a number of his art historical works, which helped rediscover artists of the Antwerp school whose names and works had been forgotten.

He died in Antwerp in 1922.

== Works ==
- De Bloedwet, een volksverhaal (Antwerp, 1862)
- Kunst en Kladschilder, blijspel met zang in éen bedrijf (Antwerp, 1863)
- Soort bij soort, tooneelspel in éen bedrijf (Antwerp, 1863)
- Spiritisme, tooneelspel in éen bedrijf (Antwerp, 1865)
- Het Erfdeel van Matant, tooneelspel in éen bedrijf (Antwerp, 1866)
- De jonge Kunstenaar, dram. gedicht (won a prize, Amsterdam, 1866)
- Een nieuwbakken Rijke, comedie in drie bedr. (Antwerp, 1867)
- Tusschen twee Vuren, tooneelspel in éen bedrijf (won a prize, Antwerp, 1867)
- Geschiedenis der Academie van Antwerpen (awarded a prize by Antwerp City Council for the bicentenary of the Academie van Beeldende Kunsten, Antwerp, 1867)
- Huiselijk Wel en Wee (Antwerp, 1867)
- Huwelijksspeculatie (Antwerp and Amsterdam, 1868)
- Bedrogen! (Antwerp, 1868)
- Baas Gansendonck (play after Hendrik Conscience's moral sketch, published in three editions, Antwerp, 1868)
- Frans Wouters, Kunstschilder (1612-1659, Antwerp, 1872)
- De Val van Antwerpen, geschiedk. drama in zeven tafer. (bekroond, Gent, 1873)
- Eenige Bladen uit de geschiedenis van het Onderwijs te Antwerpen (Antwerp, 1874)
- Mijnen vrienden Jan van Beers en Hendrika Mertens op hunne zilveren bruiloft (poem, Antwerp, 1875)
- Willem van Nieuwelandt, Kunstschilder en Dichter (1584-1635, Gent, 1875)
- Beknopt verslag over het gebruik der hoofdletters in de familienamen, gedurende de zes laatste eeuwen (Antwerp, 1875)
- Eugeen Zetternam, Volksschrijver (1826-1855, Antwerp, 1876)
- Adriaan de Brouwer en Joos van Craesbeeck (Haarlem, 1881 and Antwerp, 1882)
- Geschiedenis der Antwerpsche Schilderschool (won first prize in an Amsterdam City Council competition, Antwerp, 1883)
- Toespraak bij de onthulling van het marmen borstbeeld van Peter Benoit, Herstichter der Vlaamsche Muziekschool (Antwerp, 1886)
