= Kodam XV/Pattimura =

Indonesian army military region command

XV Military Regional Command/Pattimura
- Komando Daerah Militer XV/Pattimura
- Kodam XV/Pattimura coat of arms
- Active: 27 May 1957 – present
- Country: Indonesia
- Branch: Indonesian National Armed Forces Tentara Nasional Indonesia (Indonesian)
- Type: Indonesia Regional Military Command
- Part of: Indonesian Army
- Mottos: Lawamena Haulala (war cry) "Onward till the last drop of blood!"
- Website: www.kodam16pattimura.mil.id

Commanders
- Commander: Maj. Gen. Putranto Gatot Sri Handoyo

Komando Daerah Militer XV/Pattimura (XV Military Regional Command/Pattimura), abbreviated Kodam XV/Pattimura, is the Defense Regional Command of the Indonesian Army which contains Maluku Islands.

== Task ==
As the Development Kotama, Operational Kotama and regional Command, the XV MRC is entrusted with the following:

1. Carry out the tasks of TNI land dimensions in the region of North Maluku and Maluku.
2. Implement security of the North Maluku and Maluku regions bordering other countries.
3. Carry out the construction and development of the strength of the land force TNI in North Maluku and Maluku.
4. Implement the empowerment of land defense areas according to their role and authority and realize the unity of the People's TNI.
5. Carry out other tasks in accordance with statutory regulations and laws of the Republic.

== History ==
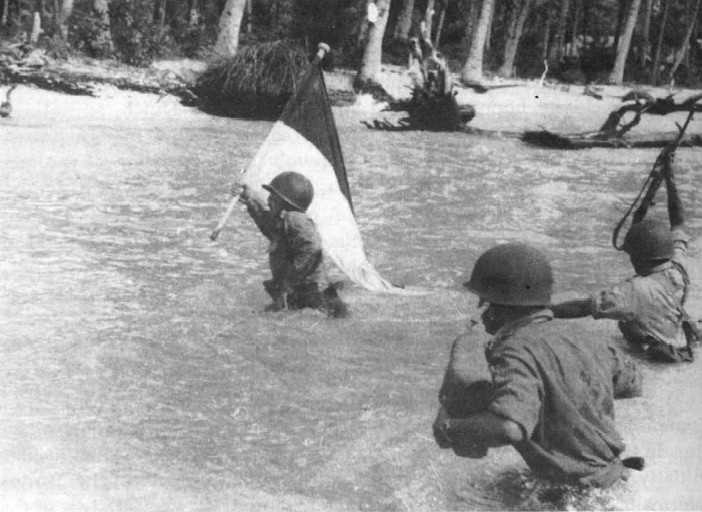
Pattimura Battalion's troops landed in Buru Island in July 1950

In the summer of 1950, southern parts of the Maluku Islands, with majority Christian populations, were rebel territory with the proclamation of the so-called Republic of South Maluku (RMS), and its army was mainly composed of demobilized ex-Royal Netherlands East Indies Army (KNIL) soldiers and other South Moluccan men who remained loyal to the Dutch crown, even during the days of the United States of Indonesia wherein Maluku was one of its constituent states. The Indonesian government, represented by then Minister of Defense Abdul Halim and the Commander of the National Armed Forces, Major General T. B. Simatupang, was very much furious with this act of rebellion, and by late August, President Sukarno was convinced that the time had time for the Army to assert the authority of the by now unitary national government in these islands, which during the National Revolution saw fighting between the regular Dutch forces and their pro-Dutch supporters and pro-republic Christian and Muslim inhabitants. In response, the elements of the then Sulawesi-based 7th Territorial Army Command Eastern Indonesia, which had the Maluku islands are part of its area of responsibility, began to draw up plans for a military operations movement called "South Maluku Army Command" with operational commander Colonel Alexander Kawilarang (TA Commander for Eastern Indonesia), which was then handed over to Lieutenant Colonel Slamet Riyadi. The South Maluku Army Command, late in August, was charged with the invasion of the Buru, Seram, Ambon and Lease islands to reclaim the islands from the hands of the RMS government through guerilla operations. After succeeding in its operations movement, the Chief of Staff of the Army on August 30, 1950 ordered the transformation of the South Maluku Army Command into the D Force Command (KOMPAS D ) under the leadership of Lieutenant Colonel J.F. Warouw and composed partly of the Christians and Muslims of Maluku who supported the government in Jakarta. That force was the main local formation that helped the Army win the Invasion of Ambon in the early fall of 1950.

The D Force Command on July 5, 1952 was later transformed into the 25th Infantry Regiment, 7th TA under the leadership of its first regimental commander, Lieutenant Colonel Sukowati.

A Decree of the Chief of Staff of the Army May 27, 1957 established the Maluku and West Irian Regional Military Command (KDM-MIB), with the first Commander being Colonel Herman Pieters and on October 24, 1959 the Maluku and West Irian Military Regional Command was changed to the Maluku West Irian Military Region "Pattimura" (MIB "Pattimura"), the honorific recalling the bravery of the local namesake hero who in 1817 fought valiantly against Dutch administration in the islands for abuses against the people. On May 7, 1960, Major General AH Nasution, Commander of the Armed Forces, handed over the command colour to the commanding officer of the military region, COL Herman Pieters. Later on, it became Kodam XV/Pattimura with the separation of West Papua to form its own military command.

For service to the homeland and loyalty to Pancasila and the Constitution of 1945, as well as instilling the values of patriotism and civil-military community development to the peoples of the Moluccas, Kodam XV / Pattimura was later on awarded by President Suharto with the Presidential Unit Citation (Armed Forces) (Samkarya Nugraha).

=== Korem 174 / Pattimura period ===
In accordance with the development of the strategic concept of Defense and Security in general and whole of the Armed Forces in particular, several TNI AD Commands (Kotama) including Kodam XV / Pattimura were merged to other regional commands according to the demands of military reorganization policies of the then Commander of the Armed Forces, General Leonardus Benjamin Moerdani in a General Orders signed on 22 September 1984. Then, in accordance with a Decree of the Chief of Staff of the Army dated December 26, 1984 and realized with the Decree of the Military Commander XV / Pattimura on January 8, 1985, the 174th Military Area Command Pattimura was formed which covered the entire Kodam XV/ Pattimura area of operations. On May 6, 1985, Brigadier General H. Simanjuntak handed the command colour of the 15th RMC to the then Chief of Staff of the Army, General TNI Rudini, officially dissolving the regional command. With psychological and historical considerations, the name Pattimura was retained as the newly formed Korem name with Col. Inf Soeharsono S appointed as the first area commander, who reported under the command of the newly formed Kodam XVII /Trikora, with HQ located in Jayapura, Papua.

=== Kodam XVI / Pattimura period ===
After decades of peace, in the aftermath of the fall of Suharto from power sectarian violence flared in the islands in the 1999-2002 Maluku sectarian conflict. With the threat of religious violence spreading into the now twin provinces of the Maluku Islands the National Armed Forces made it clear that the diversity of the island's peoples and religions were at stake and a territorial reorganization was needed to ensure a stronger military presence. Pursuant to several orders by the office of the Chief of Staff of the Army, on May 7, 1999 the 174th MAC was dissolved and in its place Kodam XVI/Pattimura was reactivated on May 15, 1999 in Ambon during a Military Ceremony presided by the Chief of Staff General TNI Subagyo HS. On the occasion of the ceremony the Chief of Staff officially inaugurated Brigadier General Max M.Tamaela as the first regional commander and the historic day was subsequently celebrated as the Anniversary of Kodam XVI / Pattimura. Reborn in the face of interreligious violence, today the 16th RMC is committed to help contribute to national defense and territorial integrity, as well as in community development. It was the servicemen of this command, in the aftermath of the Malino II Accord of 2002, that helped the peoples of Maluku recover from the years of violence that divided the Christian and Muslim communities, and thus helped the transformation of these frontier islands of the east into havens of diversity.

== Unit ==
=== Territorial Formations ===
The territorial command is subdivided into a Military Area Command and a Separate Military District:

- 1504th Military District Command (Separate) in Ambon
- 151st Military Area Command/Binaiya with HQ in Ambon

- 1502nd Military District Command
- 1503rd Military District Command
- 1504th Military District Command
- 1506th Military District Command
- 1507th Military District Command

=== Combat and Combat Support Formations ===
- 27th Infantry Brigade Nusa Ina
  - Brigade HQ
  - 731 Raider Infantry Battalion/ Kabaresi
  - 734 Infantry Battalion / Satria Nusa Samudera
- 733rd Raider Infantry Battalion/Masariku
- 735th Infantry Battalion
- 5th Armored Cavalry Detachment/Birgus Latro Cakti
- 5th Combat Engineers Detachment/ Cakti Mandra Guna

=== Educational Unit ===
- 16th Regional Training Regiment

* Secata Rindam XV / Pattimura
* Secaba Rindam XV / Pattimura
* Dodiklatpur Rindam XV / Pattimura
* Dodikjur Rindam XV / Pattimura
* Dodik Bela Negara Rindam XV / Pattimura
