= Fort Duurstede =

Coordinates: 3.5667°S 128.6500°E

- Fort Duurstede
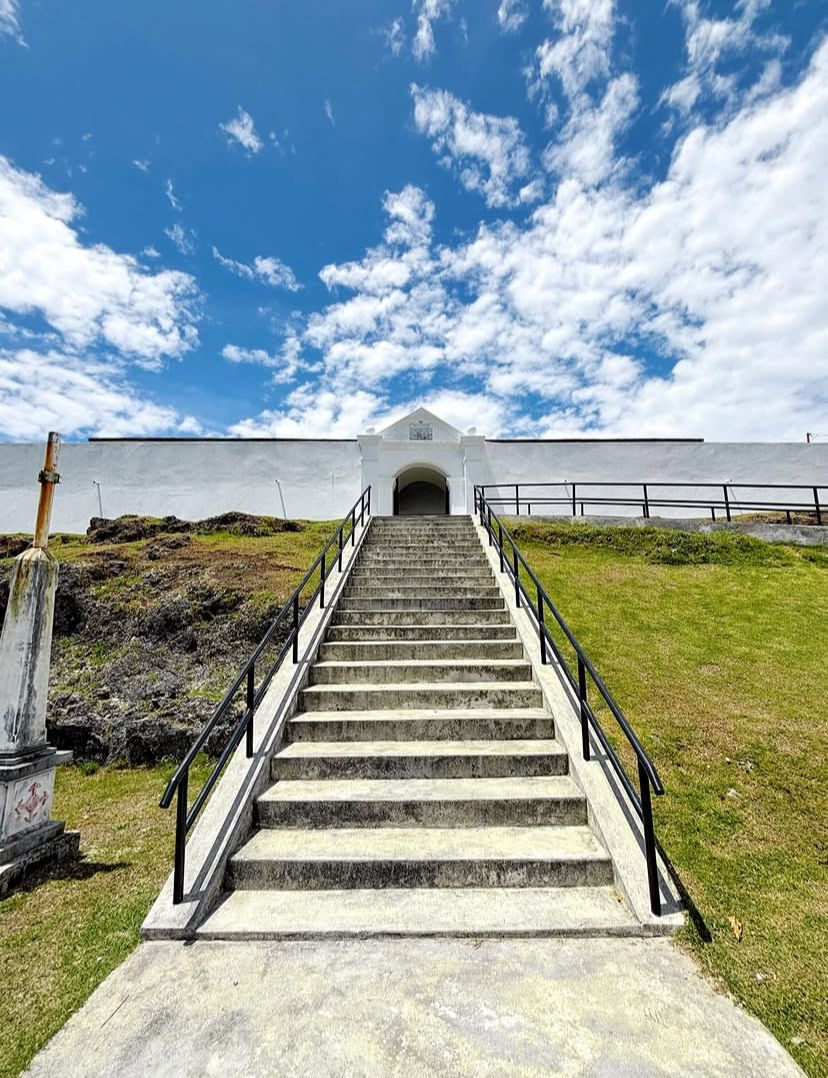
- Main entrance of Duurstede Fort
- Interactive map of the Fort Duurstede area
- Etymology: Named after the town of Wijk bij Duurstede in the Netherlands.

General information
- Type: Fort
- Location: Saparua, Maluku Tengah, Indonesia

Fort Duurstede is a 17th-century colonial Dutch fort in Saparua, Indonesia The fort originally protected Saparoea village. A navigation guide from 1878 advises: "There is good anchorage near this fort in the westerly monsoon in about 12 fathoms."

== History ==
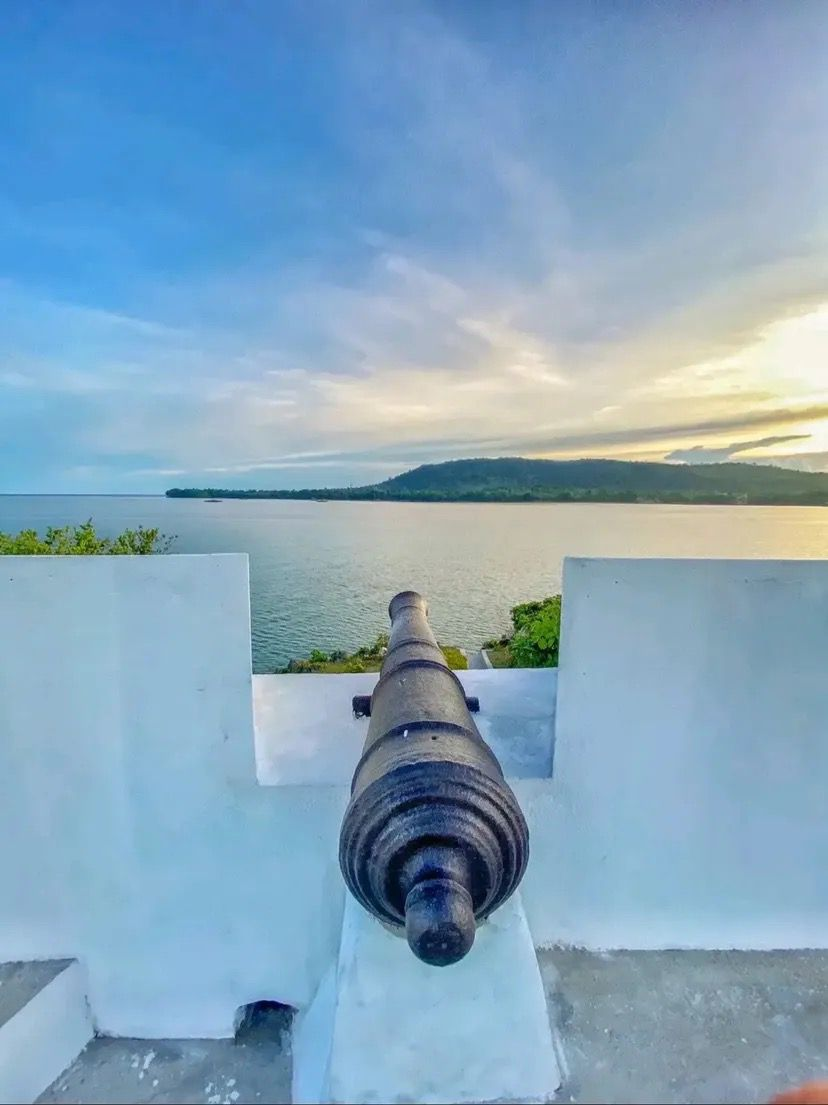
Iron cannon at Duurstede Fort

Duurstede Fort was first established in 1676, though its more permanent structure was built and fortified by the Governor of Ambon, Nicolaas Schaghen, in 1691. Throughout the colonial era, the fort served as both a military defense hub and the administrative center for the Dutch East India Company (VOC) in the Saparua region.

On May 15, 1817, the people of Saparua, led by Kapitan Pattimura, launched a fierce assault on the fort. The uprising resulted in the deaths of nearly all inhabitants, with the sole survivor being Jean Lubbert van den Berg, the son of the resident. The fall of Duurstede to the Moluccan people significantly destabilized the Dutch East Indies' position from Ambon to Batavia. Despite several attempts to reclaim the fort, Dutch counter-attacks repeatedly failed.

Facing a desperate situation, Commissioner van Middelkoop took aggressive action by requesting military reinforcements from Batavia. Rear Admiral Buyskes arrived in Ambon on September 30, 1817, aboard the massive warship 'Prins Frederik' under the command of Captain van Senden. Equipped with 40 heavy cannons, the warship brought 250 infantrymen from Batavia, further bolstered by 160 soldiers from Ambon, bringing the total strike force to 410 personnel.

Buyskes implemented a siege strategy, seizing control of the islands surrounding Saparua before penetrating Pattimura’s main defenses. This tactical pressure eventually forced Pattimura’s troops to retreat into the sago forests and mountains. Ultimately, Kapitan Pattimura and his four commanders were captured and sentenced to death by hanging at Fort Nieuw Victoria.

== gallery ==
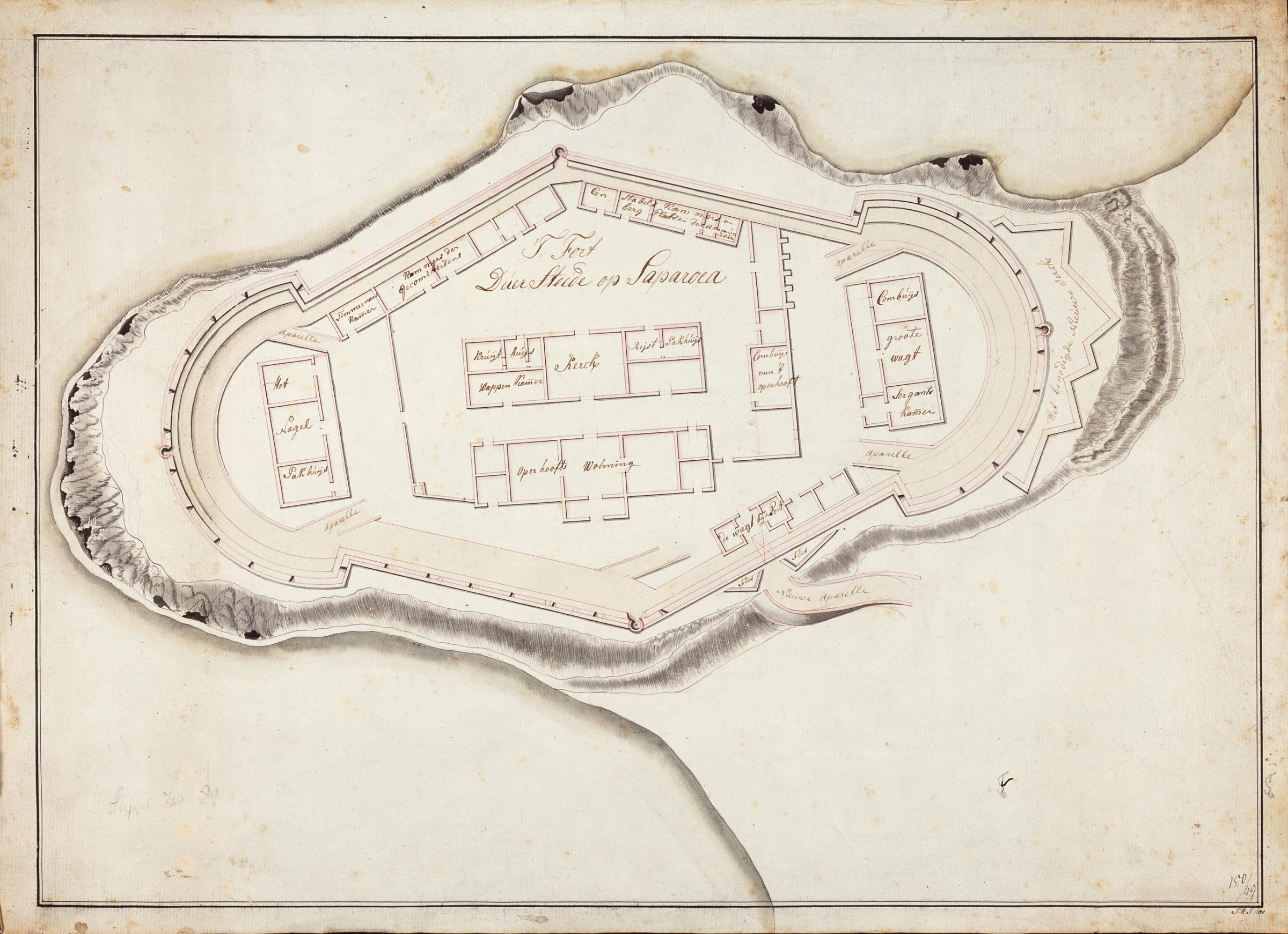
Map of Fort Duurstede on Saparua

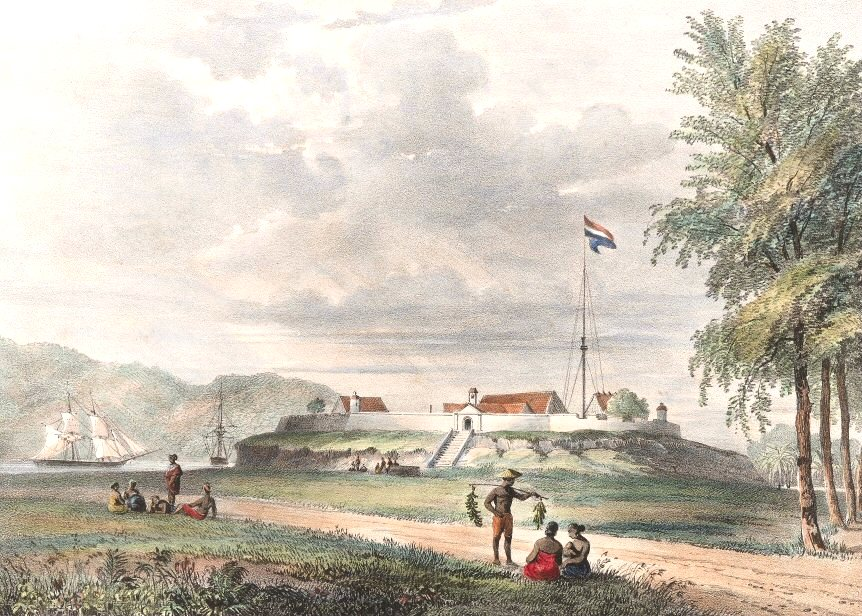
Fort at Saparua, by Charles William Meredith van de Velde, 1844

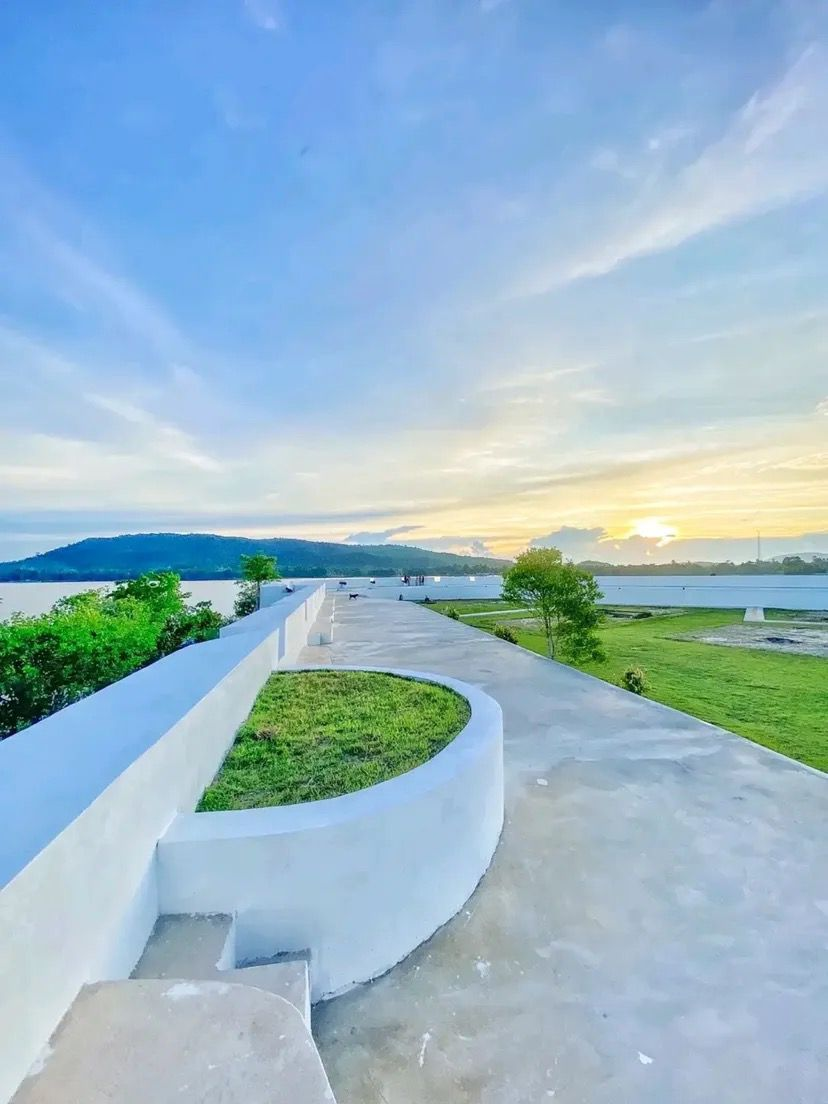
A recent view of Duurstede Fort

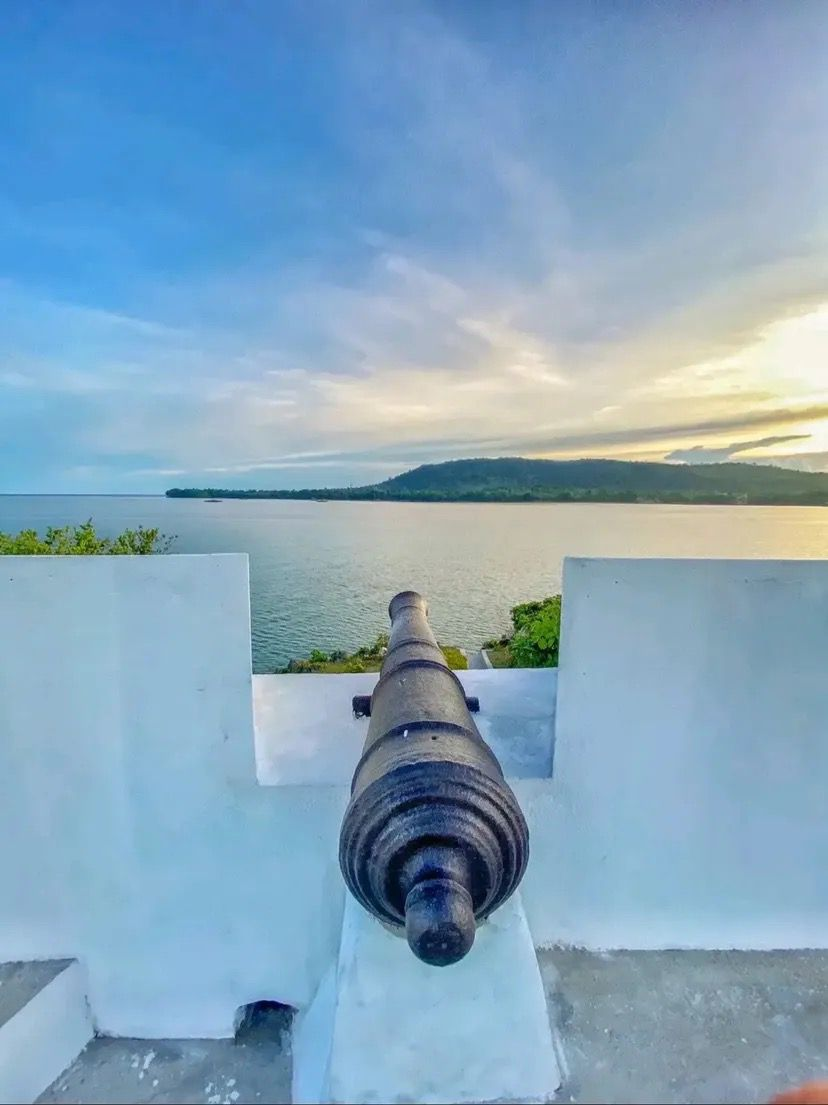
Iron cannon at Duurstede Fort

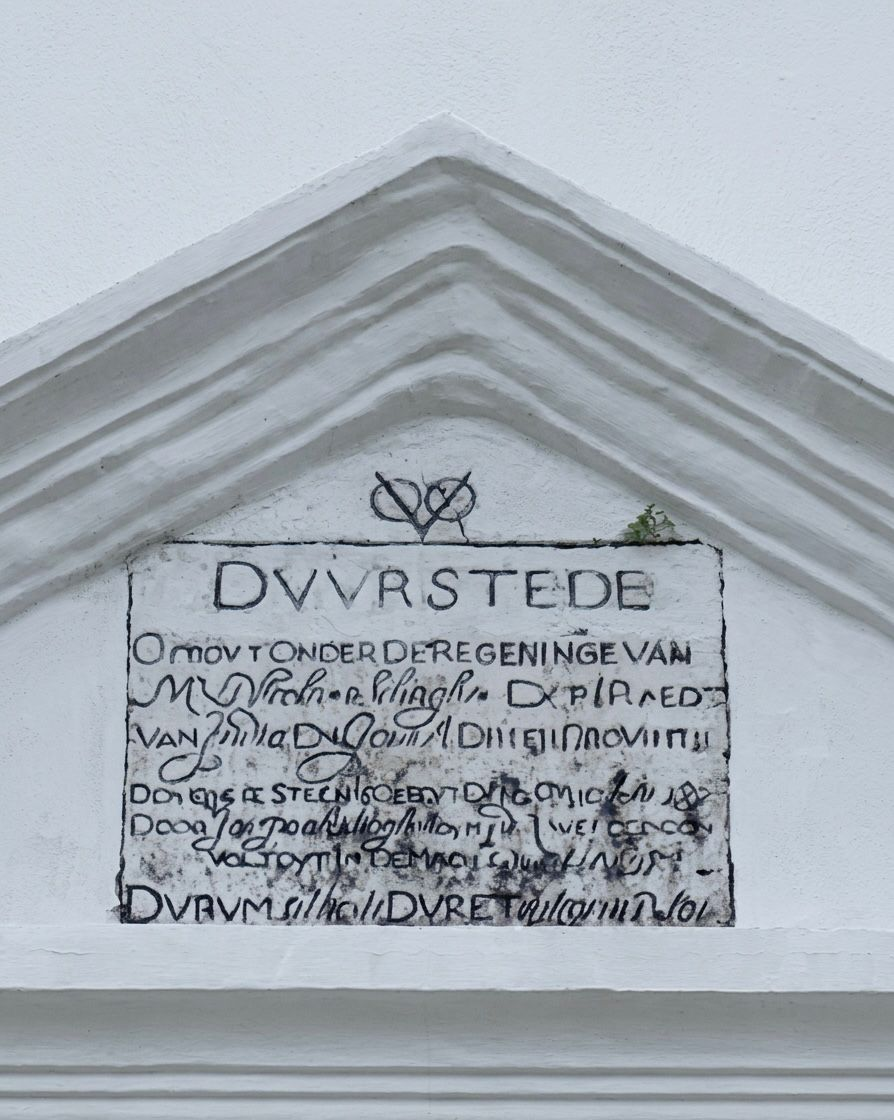
Inscription at the entrance gate, Duurstede Fort

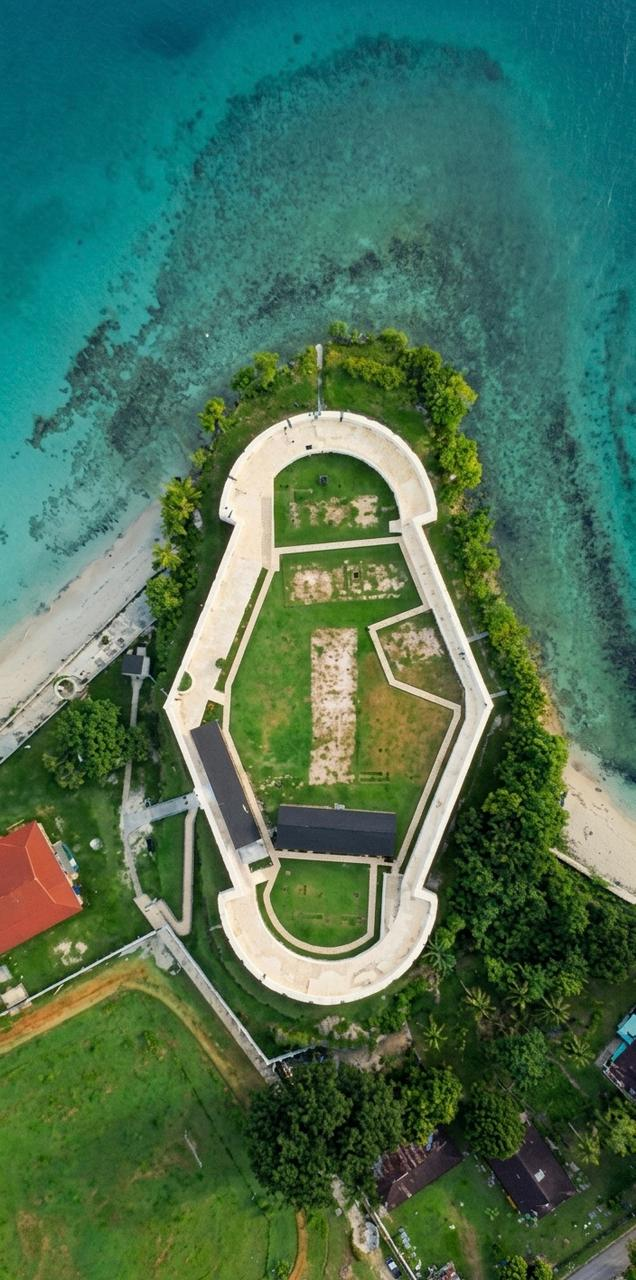
Aerial view of Duurstede Fort
