= Johannes Godefridus Frederiks =

Dutch historian and literary scholar (1828-1896)

Johannes Godefridus Frederiks (24 April 1828– 5 May 1896) was a Dutch historian and literary scholar, co-editor of the second edition of the Biographisch woordenboek der Noord- en Zuidnederlandsche letterkunde (Amsterdam, 1888–1890).

== Life ==
Frederiks was born at Duinvliet, near Oostkapelle, on 24 April 1828, the son of Pieter Jacobus Frederiks (1803-1872) and Wilhelmina Cornelia Poelman (1803-1861). He was educated at Domburg as a student-teacher and taught at schools in Middelburg, Colijnsplaat, Drimmelen, Geertruidenberg and Rijswijk, before becoming a private docent in The Hague. There he was employed to tutor the officers and medics of the first Japanese embassy. In 1858 he married Antonetta Johanna Cornelia Koning. In 1871 he was appointed to teach history and Dutch language and literature at the Hogere Burgerschool in Zutphen, and in 1880 he transferred to the Gymnasium in Amsterdam. He retired in 1886, and died in Amsterdam on 5 May 1896.

== Publications ==
As author

- Soestdijk (1874)
- De intocht van Karel den Stoute te Zutphen (1876)
- De moord van 1584: Oorspronkelijke verhalen en gelijktijdige berichten (1884)
- Uit de dagen van Hollands weelde (1884)
- Oefeningen in de Ned. Taal (1884)
- De historische namen gegeven aan de nieuwe straten van Amsterdam (1892)

As editor

- Biographisch woordenboek der Noord- en Zuidnederlandsche letterkunde (1888–1890)
