= Oudgastenpartij =

The Oudgastenpartij (Dutch for "Party of the 'Old Boys' ") was a political faction hostile to the reforms of the Commissioners-General of the Dutch East Indies and to the subsequent rule of governor-general Godert van der Capellen who were active in the first third of the 19th century in the colonial Dutch East Indies.

== Description ==
In the waning days of the VOC as the ruler of the Dutch East Indies the political power in Batavia, the capital city of the colony, had come into the hands of a corrupt clique around the families of Willem Arnold Alting, Pieter Gerardus van Overstraten, and Johannes Siberg, (Note: Who later would become the acknowledged, though informal, leader of the Oudgastenpartij until his death in 1817.) all at a time Governor-general of the Dutch East Indies in the period between 1780 and 1807, and their hangers on. This faction was known as the oudgasten, a Dutch word that means "someone who has lived for a long time in the Dutch East Indies", but with the connotation of an "old boys network". (Note: A comparable name would be the Bourbon Democrats in the Old South of the United States.) After the VOC was nationalized under the Batavian Republic the political power position of these people was jeopardized by the successive reformers the Mother country sent out: first Herman Willem Daendels, and (under the British governor-general Stamford Raffles) Herman Warner Muntinghe, and later the Commissioners-General of the Dutch East Indies. A new class of colonial civil servants gained ascendance, known colloquially as the "Baren" ("new people", with the connotation of Carpetbaggers. (Note: Kemp explains the etymology of the word as follows. The Malay word orang baru means "new man". This was shortened to just baru by the Dutch, which subsequently became baar.'"`UNIQ--ref-00000002-QINU`"'))

As the party did not have a formal organization, it is difficult to present a formal membership list. However, Kemp names a number of prominent people as subscribing to the common views of the faction: Nicolaus Engelhard, Johannes Siberg, Wouter Hendrik van IJsseldijk, Willem Adriaan Senn van Basel, Jacob Andries van Braam, Petrus Theodorus Chassé, Pieter Hubertus van Lawick van Pabst, Lambertus Zegers Veeckens and Franz Karl Philipp von Winckelmann.

Already in the period 1817-1819 during which the Dutch East Indies were ruled by the Commissioners-General the Oudgastenpartij and the Barenpartij were at each other's throats. This intensified after Godert van der Capellen and the new High Government had come into power in 1819. The Oudgasten generally opposed Van der Capellen and his policies. (Note: Even though the members of the High Government Petrus Theodorus Chassé and Jacob Andries van Braam were sympathetic to the political principles of the oudgasten.'"`UNIQ--ref-00000007-QINU`"' Van Braam was, however, after his early death in 1820 replaced by Hendrik Jan van de Graaff, who (with Muntinghe) was more congenial to Van der Capellen.'"`UNIQ--ref-00000008-QINU`"') Their position became stronger after he was dismissed. And their influence reached a zenith under Johannes van den Bosch. (Note: Who, even in 1820 in the Motherland, already had a reputation of being sympathetic to the reactionary ideas of the Oudgasten.'"`UNIQ--ref-0000000A-QINU`"') They were enthusiastically in favor of the Cultivation system he introduced in 1830.

But this deserved reputation for corruption and reactionary political attitudes was also bandied about as a smear to taint one's political opponents in polemics, where this was less deserved. An example is given in Herweerden's polemical pamphlet in which he sarcastically complains that "...it is the oudgasten that have caused all evil that exists in the Indies, or does not exist...". In other words, oudgasten and the outgastenpartij also became swear words in the contemporary vernacular, like geus in the early Dutch Revolt, an example of what is called reappropriation in linguistics and sociology.

== Sources ==
- Herweerden, J.D. van (1860). Antwoord aan den Heer Dr. W.Bosch naar aanleiding van zijn: "Indië zoo als het geweest is en men het weêr zou willen hebben" (in Dutch). Gebr. Belinfante.
- Kemp, P.H. van der (1901). Brieven van en aan Mr. H.J. van der Graaff 1816-1826. Eene bijdrage tot de kennis der Oost-Indische bestuurstoestanden onder de regeering van G.A.G.P. baron van der Capellen. Eerste deel. Geschiedkundig overzicht (Verhandelingen van het Bataviaasch Genootschap van Kunsten en Wetenschappen Deel LII) (in Dutch). 's-Gravenhage: Martinus Nijhoff.
- Kroeze, R. (2021). "Colonial Normativity. Corruption in the Dutch-Indonesian Relationship in the Nineteenth and Twentieth Century". In Kroeze, R.; Dalmau, P.; Monier, F. (eds.). Corruption, Empire and Colonialism in the Modern Era: A Global Perspective. Springer Nature. pp. 173–208.
