= Hendrik Jan van de Graaff =

Dutch jurist

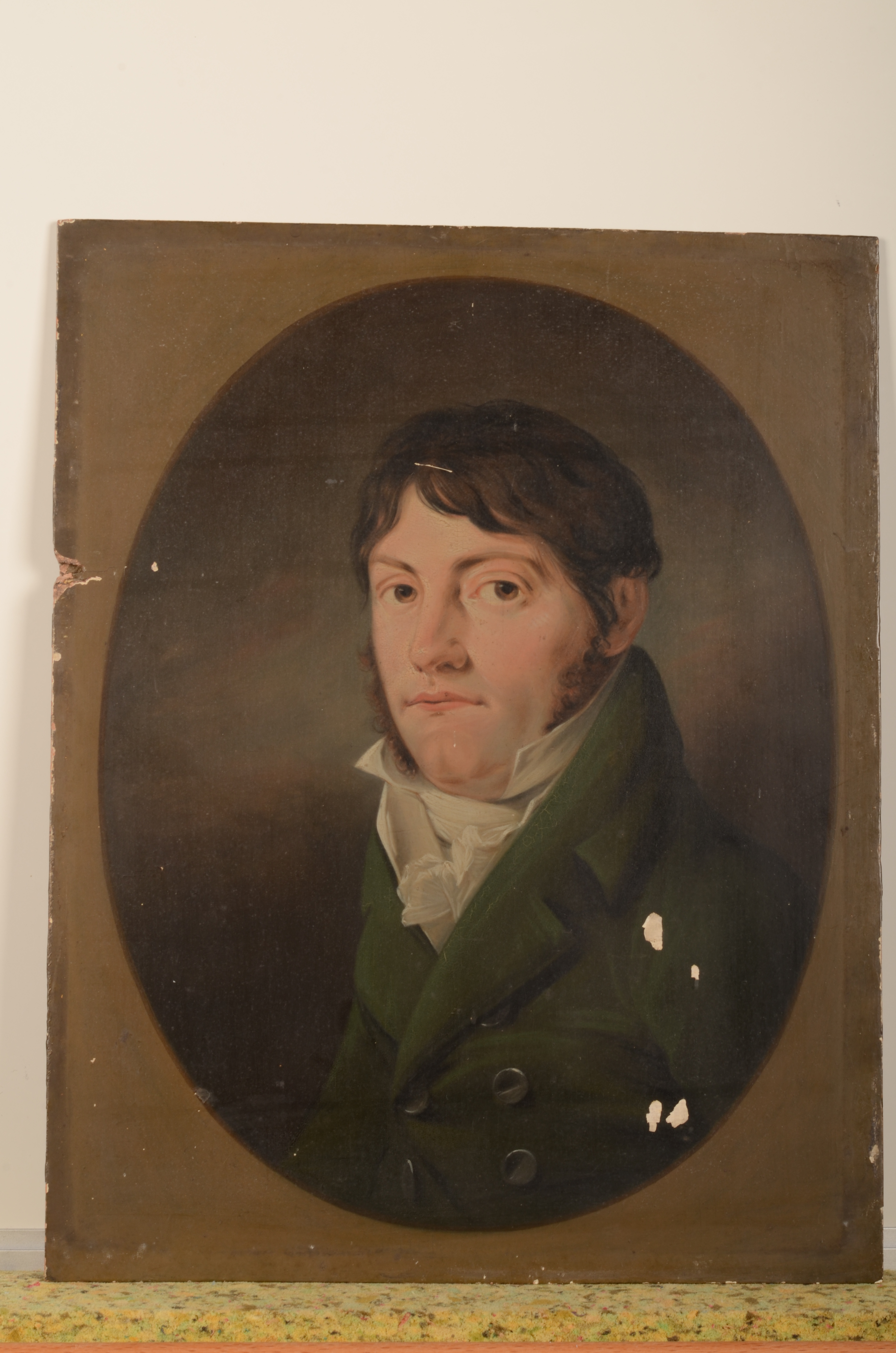
- Hendrik Jan van de Graaff

Raad van indië (Note: Member of the High Government of the Dutch East Indies)
- In office 14 May 1820 – 1 December 1826
- Preceded by: Jacob Andries van Braam
- Succeeded by: J.C. Goldman

Personal details
- Born: 7 September 1782 Dutch Suratte
- Died: 1 March 1827 (aged 44) at sea near Westkapelle, Netherlands
- Spouse(s): Maria Anna van Ness; Agatha de Dieu
- Parents: Willem Jacob van de Graaf (father); Christina Elisabeth van Angelbeek (mother)
- Education: Utrecht University (doctor juris)
- Profession: judge

Hendrik Jan van de Graaff (7 September 1782 – 1 March 1827) was a Dutch jurist who became a Raad van Indië (member of the High Government of the Dutch East Indies) in 1820, and was an ally of governor-general Godert van der Capellen, until he was recalled in 1826.

== Life ==
=== Personal life ===
Van de Graaff was the son of Christina Elisabeth van Angelbeek and Willem Jacob van de Graaf, who was director of the factory of the VOC in Dutch Suratte at the time of Hendrik Jan's birth. As a youth he was sent to Europe for his studies. He studied law at the universities of Groningen, Berlin and Utrecht. He first married Maria Anna van Ness, and after her death, Agatha de Dieu (on 22 May 1803), with whom he had eleven children.

=== Career ===
Van de Graaf had become a citizen of Alkmaar in 1801. In 1803 he became one of the three secretaries of that municipality. In 1811 (i.e. while the Netherlands were part of the First French Empire) he was appointed a judge in the local court, and in 1812 a member of the municipal council of Alkmaar. After the Netherlands reemerged as an independent country, he was appointed a member of the City Council of Alkmaar in 1815.

He led a somewhat extravagant lifestyle and got in financial difficulties, which forced him to apply for a position as a colonial administrator in the East Indies. He left with his family on the merchant ship Cornelia for Batavia where he arrived on 8 August 1816, just in time to be appointed a member of the newly created Council of Finance by the Commissioners-General of the Dutch East Indies on 16 August 1816. He accompanied two of the Commissioners-General, Godert van der Capellen and Cornelis Theodorus Elout on an inspection tour of Java in the second half of 1816. He was appointed deputy Inspector-General of the Revenue on 12 November 1817. He then lived in the estate of former governor-general Willem Arnold Alting, 'Kampong Melajoe', for a time, which cost too much money. For that reason his wife and children returned to the Netherlands in mid-1819. Van de Graaff accompanied governor-general Van der Capellen on another inspection trip around Java in the second half of 1819. In early 1820 he was appointed Chief Inspector of Finances for the entire colony. In May 1820 (after the death of Jacob Andries van Braam) he was appointed a Raad van Indië (member of the High Government of the Dutch East Indies). He held this position in addition to his post as Chief Inspector of Finance, pro bono, as he was not allowed to have any remuneration besides his salary as Raad.

After his wife left, he had lived in the house of a colleague (Bousquet) for a while, but when Bousquet moved, he bought a house that again proved too expensive for his means, so he sold that house and his furniture again, and moved in with a member of the trustees of the Batavia orphanage, De Loches. In 1823 he drafted a new ordinance (with G.F. Meylan) that prohibited the lease of land to Europeans in the Vorstenlanden, that was promulgated in May 1823. From February to September 1824 he accompanied Van der Capellen on an inspection tour of the Moluccas. He had become a trusted advisor to the governor-general by that time.

Some had become suspicious of the influence Van de Graaff had over the governor-general and considered him a "bad influence." He was in any case unpopular in circles of the Oudgastenpartij, who opposed the policies of the governor-general. The Commissioner-General Leonard du Bus de Gisignies, who was sent out to investigate Van der Capellen over his policies, which were considered obstructionist by king William I of the Netherlands, and soon replaced him as governor-general was one of his detractors. Du Bus recommended his recall, and that of his colleague Reinier d'Ozy over the question of a refusal to deliver part of the coffee harvest to a vessel of the Nederlandsche Handelsmaatschappij, as directed by the king personally, (Note: King William was an investor in the company, which Van de Graaff thought unseemly.) which was ordered on 29 August 1826. (Note: Both Van de Graaff and d'Ozy were formally dismissed on 1 December 1826 by royal decree. They were still at sea at that time, so they have never been apprised of their dismissal.) Both Raden left for the Netherlands in the Java Packet on 2 November 1826, where the ship arrived on 1 March 1827. It tried to enter the navigable channel, known as Deurlo in the West-Scheldt estuary on its way to Vlissingen, but the rudder broke and the ship foundered on the Noorder Rassen banks near the village of Westkapelle on 1 March 1827. All aboard drowned, except for the pilot.

== Sources ==
- Blok, P.J.; Molhuysen, P.C., eds. (1911). "Graaff, Hendrik Jan van de". Nieuw Nederlandsch biografisch woordenboek (DBNL) (in Dutch). Sijthoff. pp. 968–970.
- Kemp, P.H. van der (1901). Brieven van en aan Mr. H.J. van der Graaff 1816-1826. Eene bijdrage tot de kennis der Oost-Indische bestuurstoestanden onder de regeering van G.A.G.P. baron van der Capellen. Eerste deel. Geschiedkundig overzicht (Verhandelingen van het Bataviaasch Genootschap van Kunsten en Wetenschappen Deel LII) (in Dutch). 's-Gravenhage: Martinus Nijhoff.
