= Commissioners-General of the Dutch East Indies =

Commission sent out in 1815 to take over the Dutch East Indies from the British

The Commissioners-General of the Dutch East Indies (Dutch: Commissarissen-generaal over Nederlandsch-Indië as they called themselves) was a commission instituted by the Dutch king William I of the Netherlands in 1815 to implement the provisions of the Anglo-Dutch Treaty of 1814 and take over the government of the Dutch Indies from the British lieutenant-governor of Java, John Fendall. The commission consisted of the following three members: Godert van der Capellen, Arnold Adriaan Buyskes, and Cornelis Theodorus Elout. One of their tasks was to implement a new Regeringsreglement for the colony that they carried in draft form with them. But instead, they promulgated a much-amended version of that draft at the end of their mission in 1818. It embodied a transition from the "trade colonialism" of the VOC to an embryonic form of "imperial power colonialism," which would come to full fruition during the 19th century (while retaining aspects of "trade colonialism"). The "constitution" they wrote would remain in force for the Dutch East Indies in the main, though with important amendments, like the institution of the Volksraad, until the end of Dutch colonial rule.

== Background ==
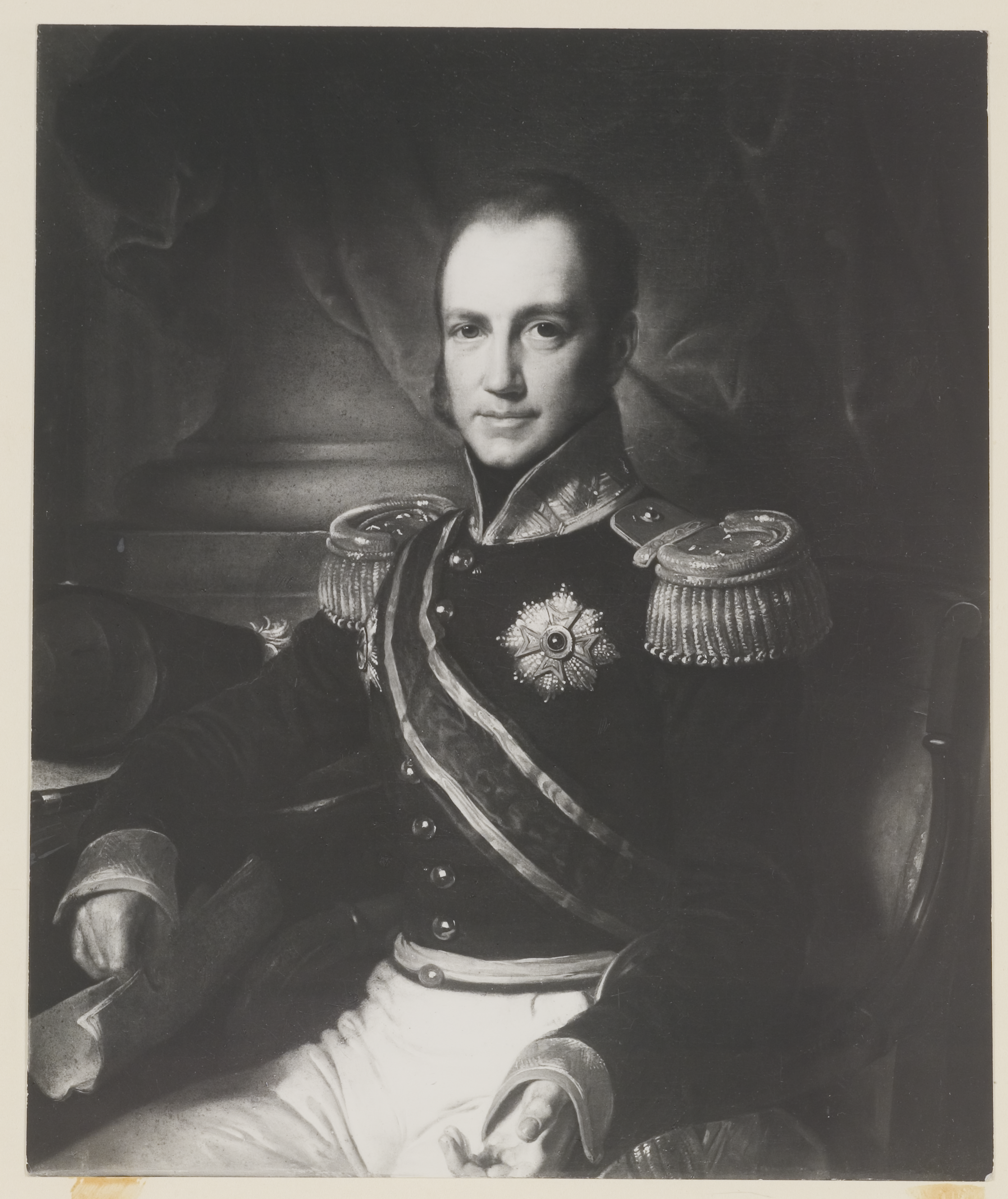
Van der Capellen

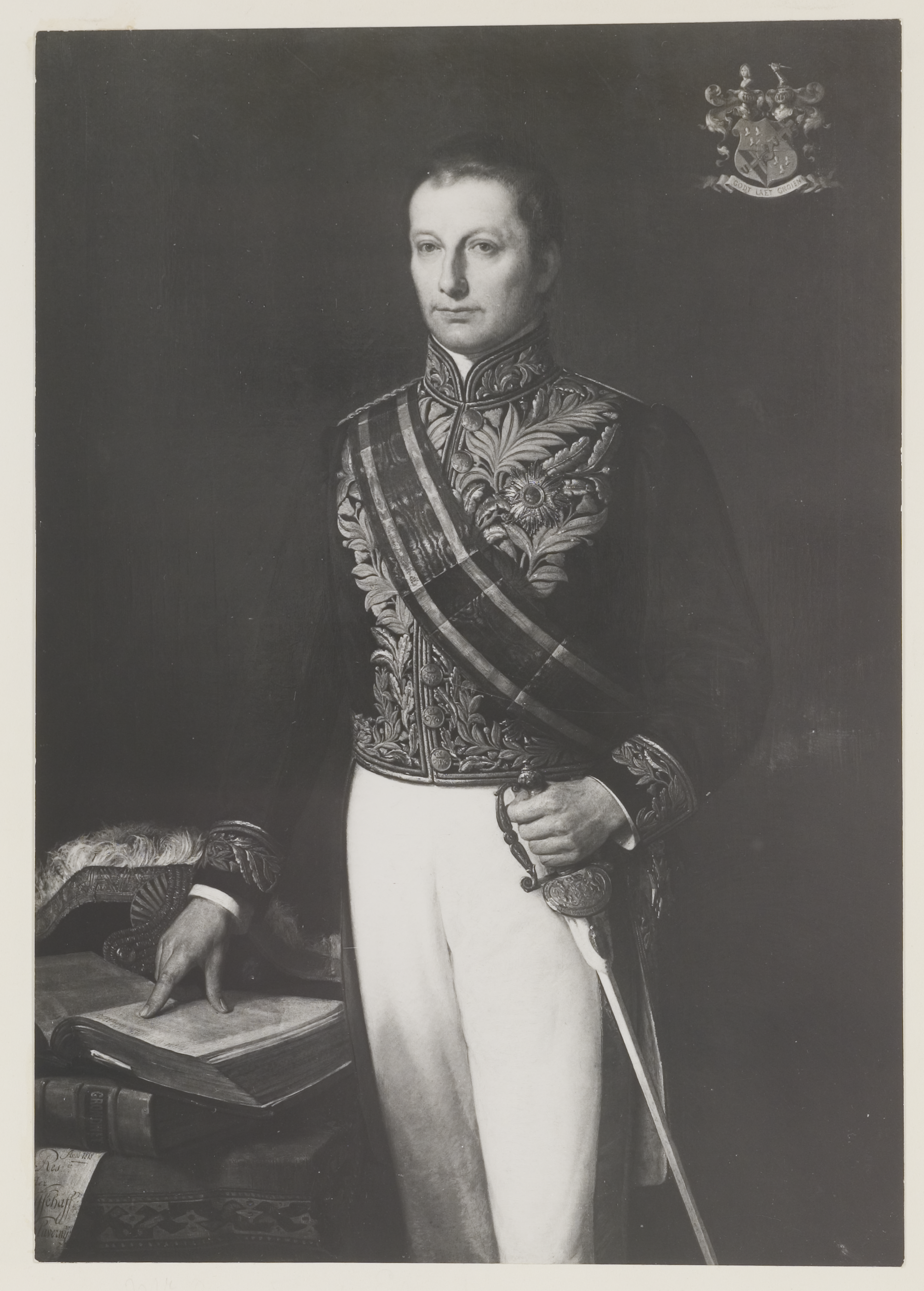
Elout

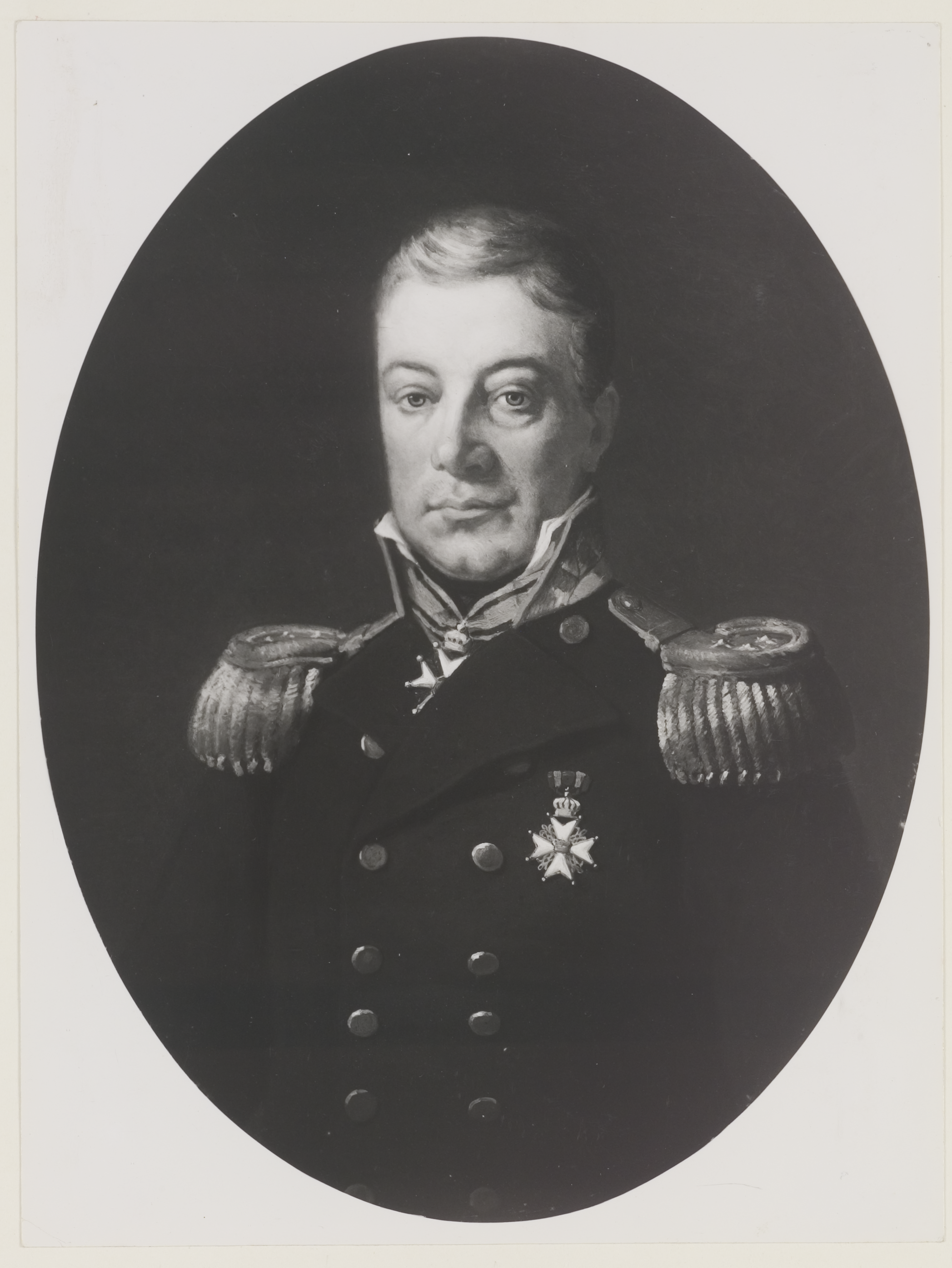
Buyskes

The British East India Company had, with help of the Royal Navy conquered the possessions of her former rival, the VOC (since nationalization, (Note: The VOC was nationalized in 1799; the Batavian Republic assuming its debt of 118 million guilders. On its face it looked a bad deal for the Dutch taxpayer, but with the debt came a claim to the possessions of the defunct company. So on balance and in the long run the deal may not have been so bad after all.) its possessions were claimed by the Batavian Republic and its successor states) in the East Indies in 1810 and 1811. Sir Stamford Raffles had, as lieutenant-governor, made an energetic start with the conversion of the institutions of the colony, but he built on the work of the last Dutch governor of Java, Jan Willem Janssens, who actually acted on the authority of the French Empire, as Napoleon had in 1810 annexed the Kingdom of Holland (the successor state to the Batavian Republic). When the Dutch state was resurrected in 1813 by the victorious allies, the British government deemed it politic to return most of the colonies of the Kingdom of Holland to this new sovereign entity (the Sovereign Principality of the United Netherlands at that moment in time). To that end, the Anglo-Dutch Treaty of 1814 was concluded with the sovereign prince (as he then was), William I.

William made plans to implement the treaty by sending an expedition to the East Indies, but the project was delayed by the events of the Hundred Days, so the expedition could only depart at the end of October 1815. By then he had become King of the United Kingdom of the Netherlands. He instituted the Commissarissen-generaal (Note: He had the authority to do this without a mandate from the parliament of the new state, because the new Dutch constitution gave supreme authority over the colonies exclusively to the king.) as the Dutch name reads, on 3 January 1815, and at the same time issued a draft of a Regeringsreglement (Constitutional Regulation) (Note: It was based in part on the "Charter" drafted in 1803 by Dirk van Hogendorp.) that was intended to replace the last Regeringsreglement promulgated by Daendels (and still in place under Raffles, with amendments). (Note: The VOC, and later the Batavian Republic, also used the term Regeringsreglement for their constitutions for the Indies.) He handed this to the three Commissioners, Van der Capellen, (Note: Governor-General designate. The Commission was to operate as triumvirate, without a formal chairman; but informally Elout took leadership on himself.) Buyskes, and Elout with the intent that they should implement it in the Indies after taking over the government from the British. As it turned out the Commissioners never did this.

== Work of the Commission ==
The Commissarissen Generaal set sail on 29 October 1815 from Texel aboard a Dutch navy squadron under command of the member of the Commissarissen Generaal, Rear-Admiral Buyskes, consisting of Zr. Ms. Admiraal Evertsen (flagship), Zr. Ms. Admiraal De Ruyter, Zr. Ms. Amsterdam, Zr. Ms. Braband, Zr. Ms. Maria van Reigersbergen, Zr. Ms. Iris, and Zr. Ms. Spion. On board of the De Ruyter were Buyskes and Elout, the botanist Caspar Georg Carl Reinwardt, and about 600 soldiers of the Indies Brigade who had served at the Battle of Waterloo, but now came to fulfill the original task of the brigade: defending the Dutch East Indies, under command of Carl Heinrich Wilhelm Anthing; another 1200 were spread over the remaining ships. The squadron arrived on the roadstead of Batavia on 21 May 1816.

It took until 18 August 1816 before Fendall finally handed over the government of Java to Van der Capellen, pleading a lack of instructions to do so from his superiors. In other parts of the Indies the handover took even longer. The Moluccas were transferred in early 1817; the former VOC possessions in India and on Malacca followed in 1818; and Sumatra in 1819. (Note: Kemp notes that the Dutch complaints about tardiness of British authorities certainly applied to the lower levels of the EIC hierarchy. He gives a long list of examples. But he also notes that the Governor-General in Calcutta acted on the contrary pro-actively and expedited the transfer of power, even in the absence of the required British Royal Warrant. He also blames Elout for needlessly annoying Fendall with his tactlessness, which may have caused the latter's obstructiveness.) In this context it is important to point out that the Dutch kingdom acted as the successor of the VOC, and only exercised the rights that company had possessed previously. The VOC did not possess the entire area that now comprises the Republic of Indonesia. The VOC had conquered a large part of the island of Java, and exercised "direct rule" there. But other parts were still autonomous, like the Surakarta Sunanate and the Yogyakarta Sultanate. Elsewhere the Governorate of the Banda Islands was under direct rule, but the Sultanate of Ternate, that comprised other parts of the Moluccas, was a semi-autonomous vassal state. Other parts of the archipel were even more autonomous, though bound to the VOC (and later the Dutch colonial government) by (unequal) treaties, like Celebes. And in 1817 the island of Bali, and large parts of Sumatra, Borneo, and of course New Guinea were still completely independent. The handover of the government to the Commissarissen Generaal was solemnly proclaimed on 19 August 1816, which at the same time also proclaimed Van der Capellen as the new Governor-General. (Note: Cf. the text of the proclamation in Oranje, Beleid, who also explains the fine legal nuances in that text and the legal basis for it)

The Commissioners decided to leave the British amendments to Daendel's Regeringsreglement in force for the time being. The old Council of the Indies was restored in its powers as a check on the Governor-General, though the Governor-General would be empowered to override the Council under certain circumstances. The Commissioners further decided to leave Raffles' cash-based land tenure system (known as the landrente) in place, as well as the monopolies from the time of the VOC, and the obligations for the population to plant and produce certain agricultural commodities. But they wished to study the possibility of lifting the spice monopoly in the Moluccas. The restrictions on commerce and shipping from the days of the VOC were lifted, opening up the Indies to commerce from other countries, except in the Moluccas. All European (Note: It is important to realize that there were two parallel systems of law in existence at the same time. The first applied exclusively to Europeans and Eurasians throughout the archipelago, who enjoyed extraterritoriality; the other, known as Adat, applied to the indigenous population.) residents would enjoy freedom to set up a business. Finally, the Commissioners decided to study the introduction of educational reforms, opening up the schools for Europeans to the indigenous population.

But these were just provisional decisions. The Commissarissen Generaal subsequently began their principal work on the formulation of a new Regeringsreglement that would be completed in 1818.

=== Interlude: the suppression of the insurrection of Pattimura ===
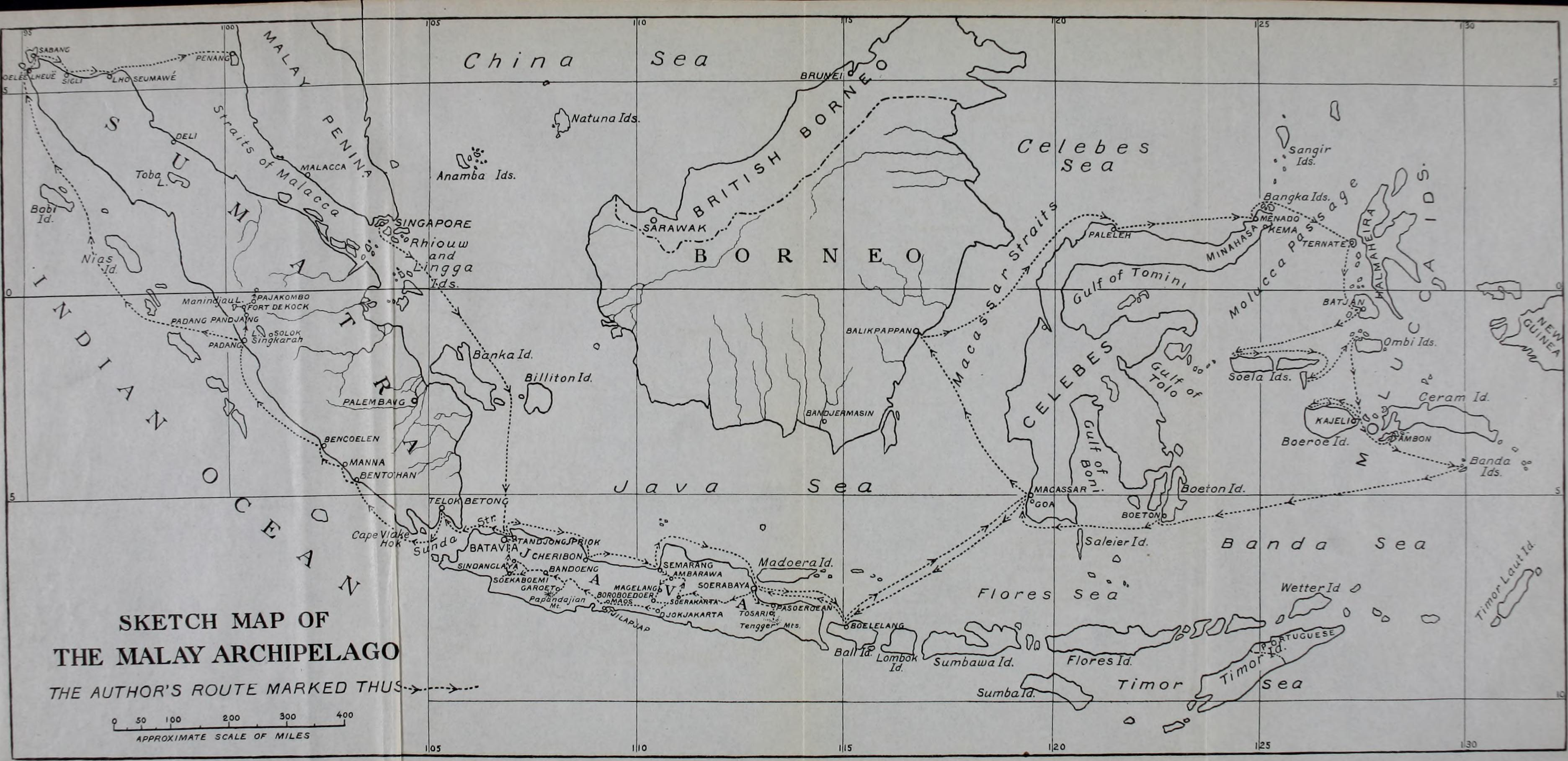
The Dutch East Indies

However, the work of the Commissarissen Generaal especially of its member Buyskes, was interrupted in May 1817 by the insurrection on the island of Saparua in the Moluccas, led by the Christian (Note: The Moluccas, especially Ambon, Saparua and Ceram had a large Dutch Reformed Ambonese population with congregations led by "schoolteachers" who doubled as lay preachers, the so-called mèsters who had great influence in the community.) Saparuan sergeant Thomas Matulessy, who had adopted the pseudonym Pattimura. The British had during their occupation of Saparua raised a regiment of mercenary soldiers, in which Matulessy had reached the rank of sergeant. When the Moluccas were handed over to the Dutch commissioners sent out by the Commissarissen Generaal in early 1817, they had disbanded this regiment, causing great distress to Matulessy and his colleagues. The new Resident for Sapurua, Johannes Rudolph van den Berg had instituted a few other tactless and unpopular policies. This caused Matulessi/Pattimura and his followers to storm Fort Duurstede on Saparua and massacre the garrison and the Resident and his family.

The subsequent punitive expedition sent out by the Dutch commissioners in the Moluccas had led to a disastrous result, and large loss of Dutch life. Only then saw these commissioners fit to inform the Commissarissen Generaal. Van der Capellen decided that the Dutch Indies government had no option but to react severely. He realized the mistakes of the Moluccan commissioners, and sacked them forthwith. He appointed Buyskes in their place and charged him with the command of a military expedition to restore "law and order" in the Moluccas and punish the insurgents. Buyskes left on 27 June 1817 with about 250 soldiers aboard the Zr. Ms. Prins Frederik to Surabaya, where he joined the Zr. Ms. Amsterdam, and another 250 soldiers came aboard the Prins Fredrik and two transports. The expedition left for Celebes on 27 July. They reached Ternate on 1 September. There the Sultan was persuaded to supply twenty so-called "kora koras" (indigenous armed proas) with a considerable number of impressed Ternatean soldiers. This flotilla arrived at the roadstead of Ambon, where it was joined by Zr. Ms. Nassau and Zr. Ms. Admiraal Evertsen. The kora koras had each about 100 native soldiers aboard (both those from Ternate and from Tidore under the command of the princes Toessan and Doekim;the most impressively martial looked the Alfoers), bringing the total to 2000 troops for the entire expedition.

In the meantime the insurrection had spread to a number of neighboring islands, among which Haruku, Nusa Laut, the south coast of Ceram, and the northern (Hitu) and western parts of Ambon and a number of individual villages on that island. Buyskes decided to first stabilize the situation on Ambon, his base of operations. He started out by on 3 October 1817 sacking the incompetent commissioners for the Moluccas, Van Middelkoop (governor) and Engelhard, and assumed the governorship himself. He delegated the governing of Ambon to a new Resident, Neijs. As to the military organisation, he formed three "divisions", named after the three warships: Evertsen, Nassau and Prins Frederik, each consisting of 46 armed sailors, complemented by a battalion of soldiers. For the leaders he formulated an instruction about what tactics to follow (with an emphasis on attempted encirclement and attacks on multiple fronts, as he deemed such tactics most effective against an enemy with low morale).

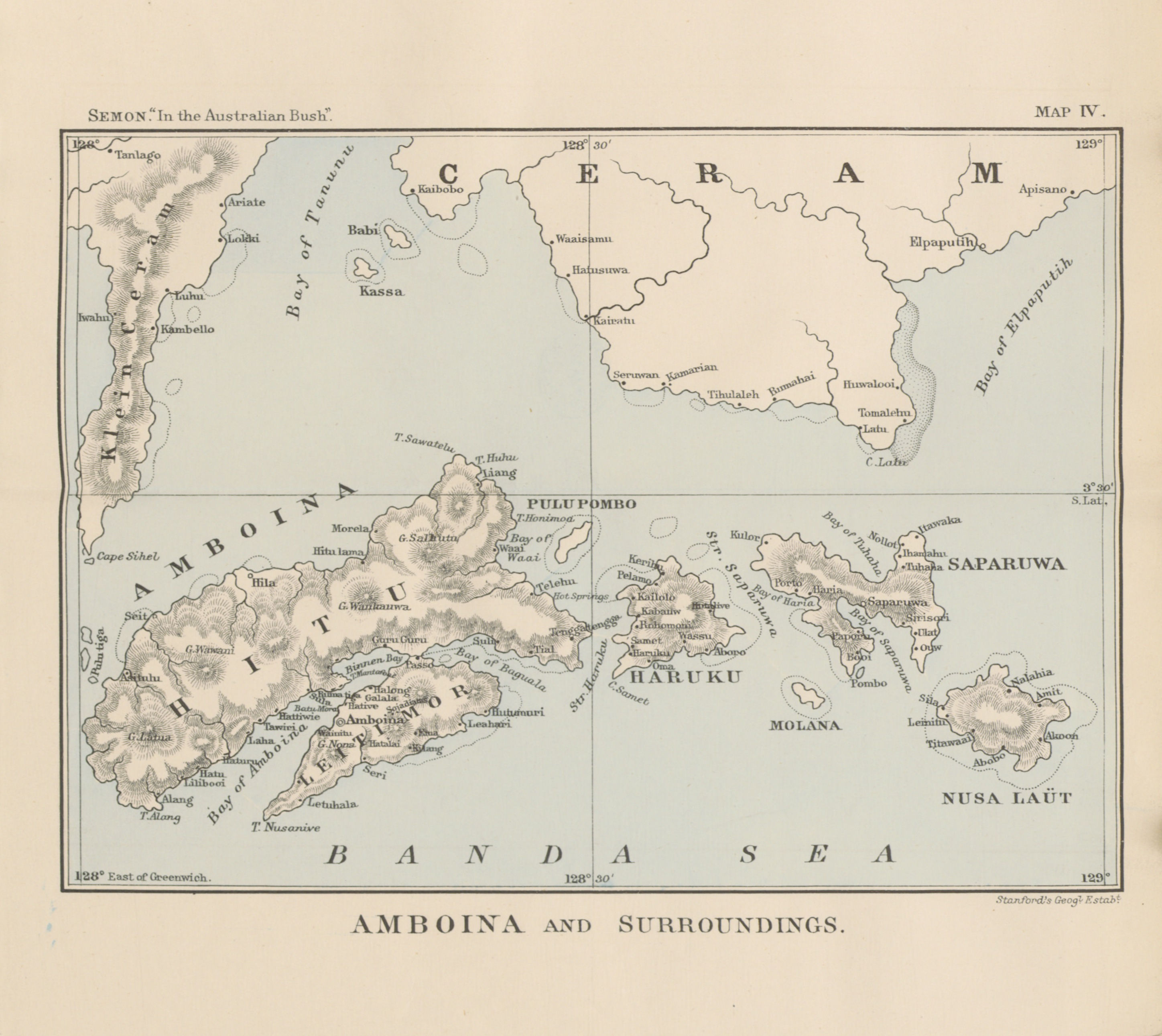
Map of Ambon and surroundings

Hitu was the first target of operations. An expedition under command of major Meijer soon brought the area under control (end of October). Next it was Haruku's turn. Begin November a landing took place there, near Kailolo, again led by major Meijer. The next target was to be Pelauw, which fell without opposition. The inhabitants, who had fled into the bush were convinced to return. But then things got out of hand. The Alfoer auxiliaries burned down a number of surrounding hamlets and started looting. Although there had been no resistance at Pelauw, major Meijer decided to "set an example" and selected 23 notables, from the 300 people he had taken prisoner, who were put in irons. He next had them summarily shot (he released the others, after they had sworn allegiance to the local Radja). (Note: Ver Huell describes this as follows "The ringleaders were presented; and Major Meijer made it known to the people in a short and powerful speech that they would be punished with death; and the guilty troop was decimated (note: he actually uses the Dutch word tiërceren from French tiercer: reduce by a third). Twenty-three were ordered to kneel down, pray, and were immediately shot dead.) Buyskes approved this conduct as he later reported.

What next happened is not entirely clear according to Kemp. The reports about the matter differ. But it seems that Meijer in the next few days decided to repeat the punitive action, this time on a beach near Pelauw, and in front of around a 1000 shocked witnesses. Again the number of victims was about 20, selected from about 400 suspected insurgents, who had surrendered on the promise of ampun (pardon). Again the others were let go after swearing allegiance to the Radja (whose own son appears to have been among the victims). Kemp condemns Meijer's conduct in strong terms, pointing out that because the promise of a pardon was broken the insurgents no longer trusted such promises, which made the pacification work more difficult.

The next part of the campaign was the conquest of the island of Saparua, which started with the posting of the Evertsen division in Fort Duurstede (which was again in Dutch hands) on 5 November 1817. Next a landing was performed near the villages Portho and Haria, which were occupied and set on fire on 8 November. This placed the insurgents who had their strong points at Tiouw and Saparua village between the two fires of Duurstede and Haria, from where a column under command of major Meijer marched to Tiouw, under constant harassment from the insurgents, which caused severe Dutch casualties. The Dutch and auxiliary troops stormed the fieldworks of the insurgents and soon those were reduced and Tiouw and Saparua village conquered. The Dutch casualties were one officer and ten soldiers killed and several wounded.

A fleet of Kora Koras with Ternate and Tidore troops arrived around midnight as reinforcements for the continuation of the campaign on Saparua. That same night (10 November) a severe earthquake woke the soldiers around 3 am. The auxiliary troops performed a landing near Siri-sori as a feint, while major Meijer's column attacked the village from the front. Pattimura was there in person to lead the defense. One Dutch assault was enough to break the resistance, however, and Pattimura escaped into the bush. The Radja of the village of Booi then approached major Meijer with the offer of rendering Pattimura into his hands. Around the same time Pattimura's lieutenant Latumahina was betrayed to the Dutch by an old man. Major Meijer marched in the morning of 11 November toward the village of Ouw that was heavily reinforced. The insurgents countered with an assault that forced the Dutch troops to take cover. In the following hour major Meijer was mortally wounded; he would live a few days longer, but died of his wounds eventually. Captain Krieger took over command. The Dutch troops remained encircled and under attack.

Meanwhile, Ver Huell (Note: Quirijn Maurits Rudolph Ver Huell was the acting captain of the Zr. Ms. Admiraal Evertsen, who also was in charge of the flotilla of ships of the line that supported the campaign. His memoir is an important source for the history of the campaign) himself went to the village of Tiouw where he suddenly was confronted with the surviving child of the Van den Berg family. The child had been wounded during the massacre of his parents and siblings, but feigned to be dead. He was eventually saved by a well-meaning Saparuan family who received permission from Pattimura to take him in. They now handed him over to Ver Huell, who eventually took care to reunite him with his mother's parents in the Netherlands.

The next day the beleaguered troops at Ouw managed to overpower their assailants. Around the same time (11 November) the fighting on the island came to a sudden halt as Pattimnura, together with his main lieutenants, Antonie Reebhok, and the Radja of Tiouw, Thomas Pattiwaal, was surprised by the Radja of Booi at Siri-sori and captured. The insurgents were brought aboard the Evertsen and put in irons.

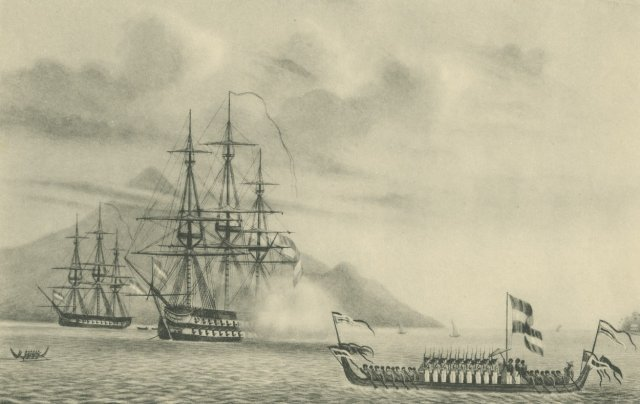
Visit Zr. Ms. Admiraal Evertsen and Zr. Ms. Nassau to Tidore, by Q.R.M. Ver Huell

Meanwhile, on 7 November another Dutch division had landed on the island of Nusa Laut, near the south-east corner of Saparua. The Radja of this island, Paulus Tiahahu, had chosen the side of the insurgents and led the resistance. He was eventually captured, together with his daughter Martha Christina. On the orders of Rear-Admiral Buyskes he was summarily shot in the presence of Ver Huell on 17 November 1817 at Fort Beverwijk on Nusa Laut. His daughter Martha Christina, who had fought alongside her father, stayed with her father to the last. She was released into the hands of a local schoolmaster after the execution, but absconded and eventually ended up on board the Evertsen as a captive. She died of an illness on the way to Java and was buried at sea.

The last resistance of the insurgents, on the island of Ceram was finally broken at the beginning of December 1817. Meanwhile, the insurgent chiefs were condemned to death by the Raad van Justitie (Council of Justice) of the Governorate of Ambon on Ambon island. They were transported from Saparua to Ambon and hanged in front of Fort Victoria on 16 December 1817. Finally, on 10 February 1818 four insurgent leaders that had been arrested on Ceram were executed, and on 20 February the Ambonese kapitan Ulupaha.

For their conduct during the suppression of the insurrection many officers and men received knighthoods of the Military Order of William. Buyskes was made a Commandeur. But Ver Huell had to wait until 1841 before he finally received his Knighthood 3rd class of the Order.

=== Formulation of the main subjects for the Regeringsreglement of 1818 ===
==== Freedom of navigation and trading ====
The instruction for the Commissarissen Generaal had indicated a number of subjects that the new Regeringsreglement should regulate. One of those was the freedom of navigation in the archipel. Under the VOC that freedom had in principle been denied both to foreign-flagged shipping and to private Dutch merchants. But this was no longer an option. So the Commissioners studied the history of the policies applied to the subject in the time of the Company, and later under the Daendels regime, and the Raffles regime. The Commissioners concluded that the only solution to the problem would be to allow freedom of navigation to both foreign-flagged shipping and private Dutch shipping on an equal footing, but that Dutch shipping would be privileged by a (discriminatory) tariff policy. (Note: That is to say, Dutch ships and merchants would enjoy either freedom from the tariff, or a reduced tariff.) However, Elout did not think this was enough to protect the Dutch interests, so he convinced his colleagues to introduce another restriction on inward bound foreign traffic: an obligation for all imports to be landed in Batavia, which was to function as a kind of Staple port after the example of the Amsterdam Entrepôt of old. Not only did this hurt the interests of ports like Semarang and Surabaya, who had a much more important hinterland then Batavia, but the accompanying bureaucracy suffocated especially the trade of non-European businessmen in the Indies, who were less used to having to navigate such obstacles. Kemp contrast this with Raffles' policy of deregulation in the new port of Singapore, which directly competed with the Dutch Indies ports, and which consequently was allowed to flourish. Finally, Van der Capellen promulgated an apparently innocuous executive order that limited the issuance of customs clearances (Note: Permission from Customs for a ship to proceed. Cf. clearance.) for shipping to the Spice Islands to ships under Dutch flag (unless a foreign flagged ship traveled under contract with the Indies Government). In effect this "administrative policy" severely limited foreign-flagged shipping in its free navigation in those islands. It would be a bone of contention with the British, who of course were the intended victims of this policy, though this was not acknowledged by the Dutch.

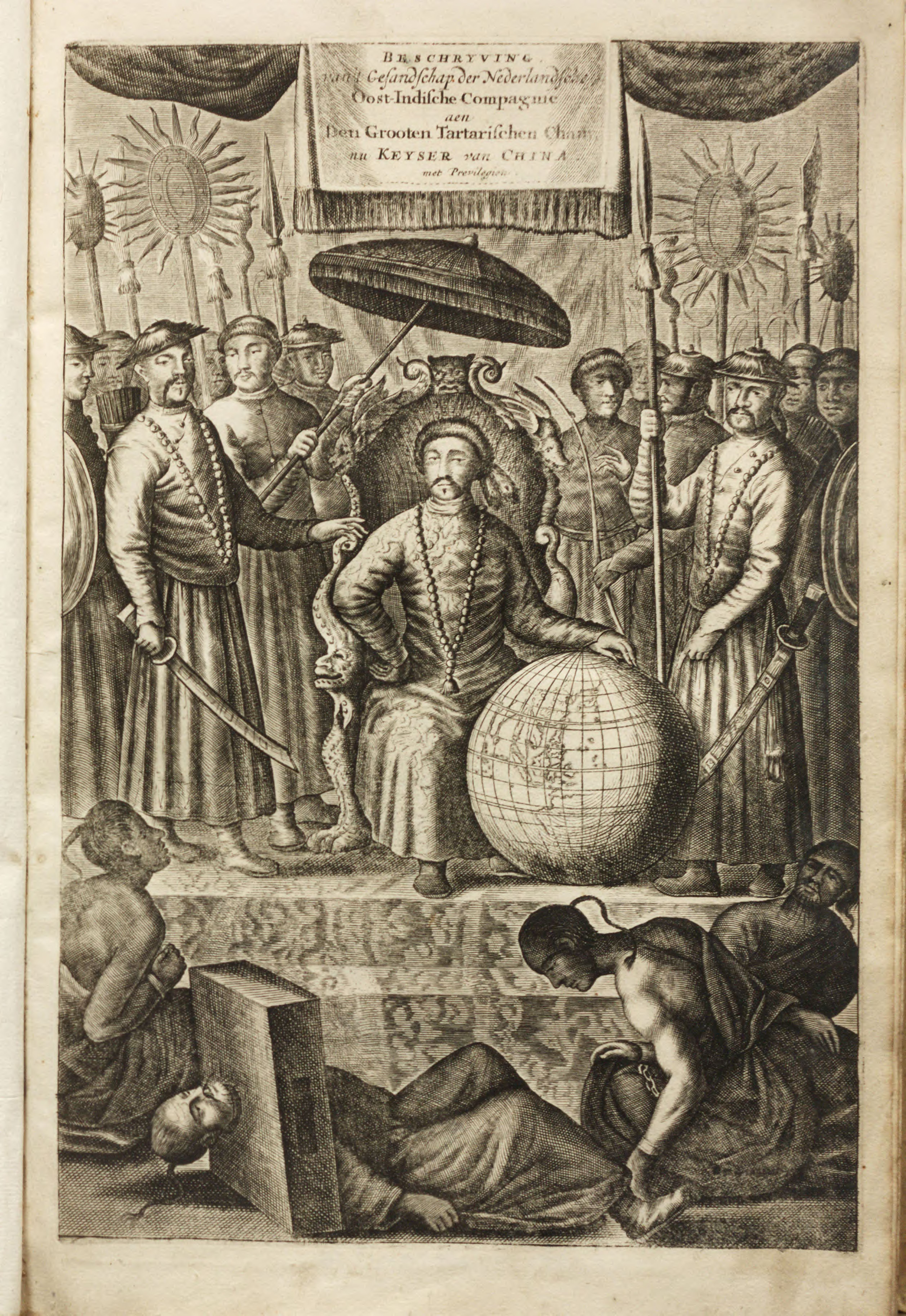
Embassy of the VOC to the Shunzhi Emperor 1656, by Johan Nieuhof

Related to the freedom of navigation was the freedom to trade in the commodities that the archipelago produced, first of all the Spice trade. Under the VOC this was legally non-existent. The VOC as a chartered company had the legal monopoly of trade on the Dutch East Indies. It was a private concern, but one endowed with quasi-sovereign rights, such as the competence to make war and peace with foreign entities, and to engage in international treaties on behalf of the sovereign of the Dutch Republic, the States General of the Netherlands. In the Indies it used these powers prolifically, using force to keep competitors like the EIC at bay, and to force indigenous rulers to conclude (unequal) treaties with it. Like the Portuguese Empire before it the VOC used a business model that could be characterized with one word: Monopoly. Or more precisely, Monopsony on the market for producers of spices, and monopoly for the market of European consumers of these spices. This policy was most successful for the market in nutmeg in the Banda Islands, where the growing of the spice was concentrated after 1621. For other spices such as pepper, that grew over a wider area, only an oligopsony, resp. oligopoly was achieved.

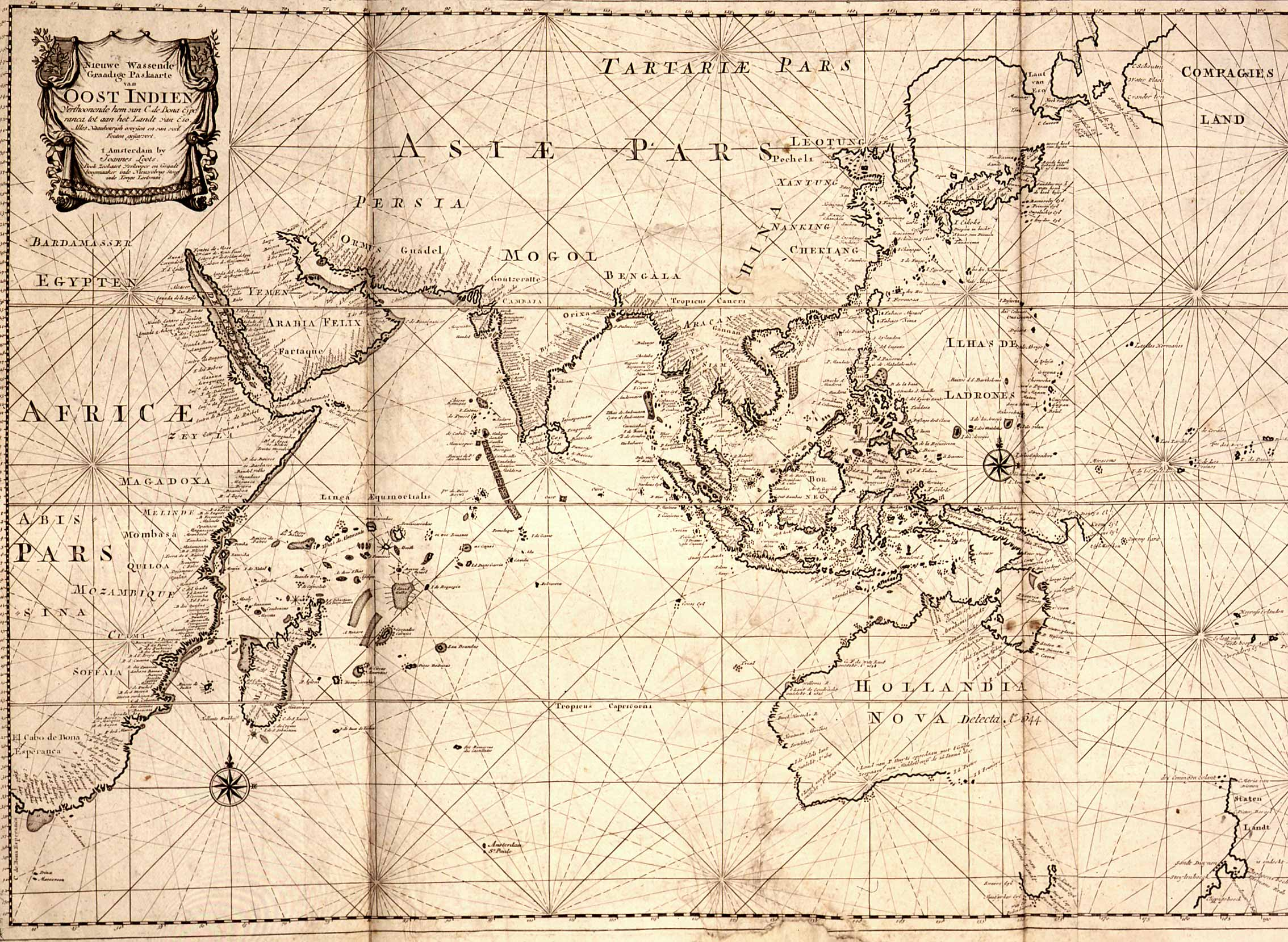
Official trade zone (Octrooigebied), allotted by its charter to the VOC

Two developments put an end to this halcyon state for the VOC. The British broke the monopoly for nutmeg during their occupation of the Moluccas by exporting rootstock to their other possessions. But more important was that new economic insights gave monopoly a bad name around the time the Commissioners had their deliberations. Monopoly rent as levied by monopolists and their ilk works to the detriment of consumers, and of the economy as a whole. The Commissioners realized that it actually was a good thing if the old monopolies of the VOC were abandoned under the new regime they were establishing. And so they decided. All merchants, foreign and domestic, would from then on be allowed to engage in the spice trade in the East Indies. Competition would eliminate the monopoly rent, and everybody (except the monopolists) would be better off. Oranje shows that these liberal views of trade had already under the VOC regime existed as a minority opinion, and that the British during their occupation had replaced the monopolies with a system of tariffs and excises on economic activities. The Commissioners decided to follow this example, but to bias the system in favor of Dutch citizens by differentiating the tariffs between foreign traders, and Dutch and Indonesian ( among whom ethnic Chinese) traders.

The VOC had (as only European traders) been allowed to trade on Japan, where a trading post had been maintained on the island of Dejima near Nagasaki. Even during the British occupation of the Dutch Indies this trading post had remained in Dutch hands. Commissioner Hendrik Doeff had been more or less marooned there during this time. The Commissioners now relieved him and sent Jan Cock Blomhoff as his replacement, to re-establish relations of the Kingdom of the United Netherlands with the Shogun.

Another matter related with foreign relations was the question whether to allow foreign nations to station their consuls in the Dutch Indies. The Commissioners opposed this notion, because they feared that this would lead to state interference with free trade. Also, as long as businessmen had free access to the Governor General, a possible conflict would not immediately have international repercussions in the absence of foreign representatives.

==== Tax system ====
Under the VOC the production of commodities remained under the control of the so-called Regents, who were deemed to own all land in their Fief and the people inhabiting it. The VOC found it convenient to deal only with these native rulers and not engage in "retail" trade (like their Asian competitors in the spice trade), but contract with them on the "wholesale" level for the delivery of the annual harvest of commodities. The Regent was solely held responsible for these deliveries, and he used his adat rights to get his subjects to expend the mostly unpaid labor necessary to produce the commodities. As a profit-maximizing enterprise the VOC directors were always concerned to avoid taking on unnecessary expense, and they certainly considered setting up a state apparatus in the archipelago, with its provision of public services, an expense to be avoided. The reverse side of this policy was that they could dispense with a system of taxation to gather the revenue that would have been necessary to maintain a state apparatus. Excise taxes were the only taxes the Company levied, just as the Dutch Regenten did in Patria.

When the Batavian Republic nationalized the VOC and so legally acquired its "assets", the reformers, like Dirk van Hogendorp, had very different ideas. He advocated an enlightened policy which would transfer the land rights to the people cultivating the land. He did not prevail, but his ideas influenced Governor-General Daendels sufficiently that the latter in practical terms abandoned the legal fiction that the land belonged to the Regents, putting another legal fiction in its place, namely that the land belonged to the sovereign of the Netherlands, and that all cultivators were legally his tenants. This would become the legal basis for the introduction of a system of taxation for the common residents to finance a state apparatus.

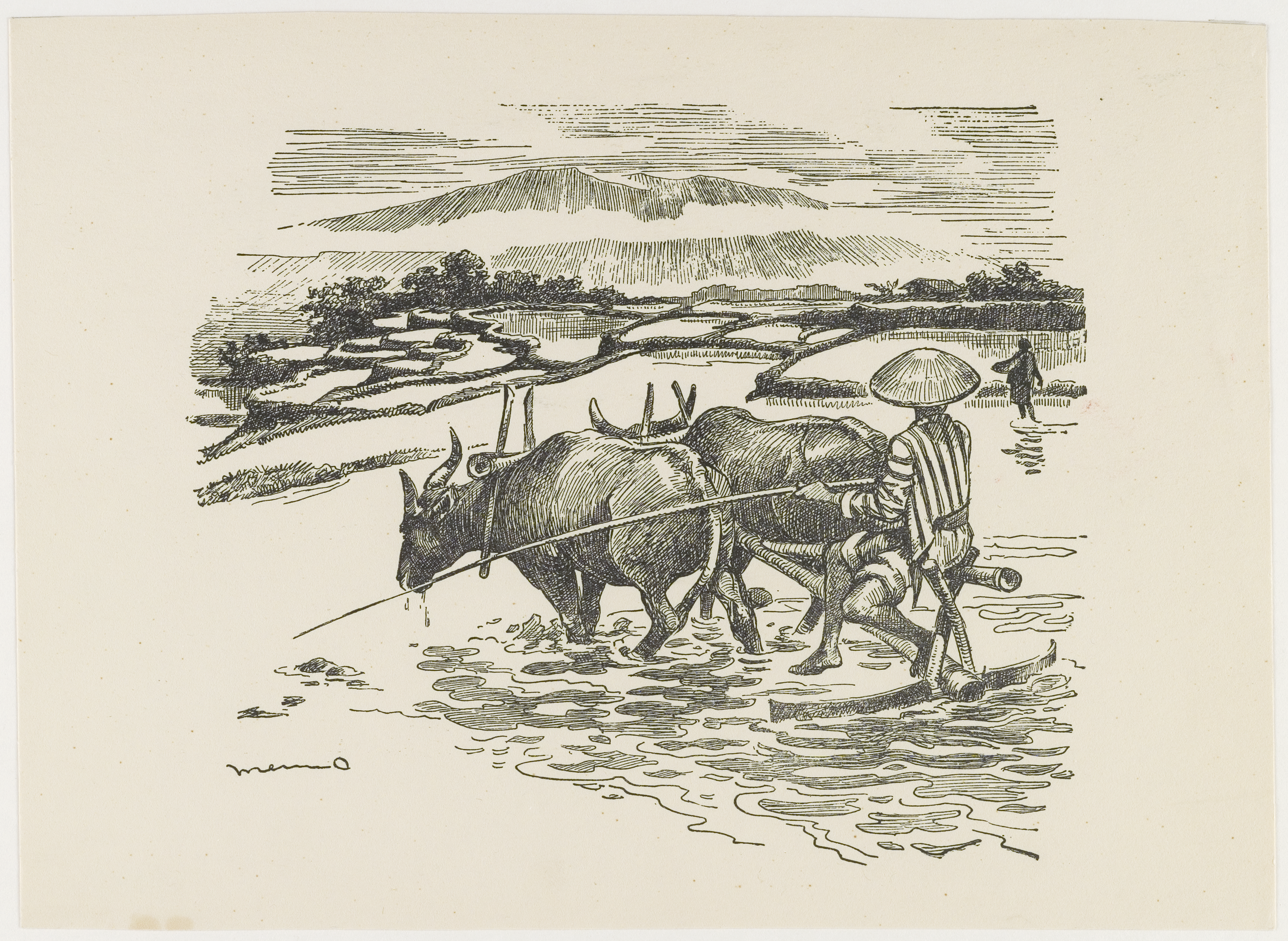
A Javanese sawah with cultivator

When the British took over, Raffles put this notion into practice in his landrente system, that was based on British common law concepts about land tenure. The Dutch colonial official Herman Muntinghe, who assisted Raffles with the design of the landrente system deserves a large part of the credit for this. The system was more than just a fiscal innovation. By introducing the notion that the land belonged to the cultivators as tenants, the economy of the archipelago was fundamentally changed. Previously, the people of the Indies were subsistence farmers who lived in a barter economy. They had no incentive to produce the commodities which interested the colonisators, and left to their own devices they would probably only have planted rice. The landrente system would transform them (at least in the long run) into farmers who produced for the world market, was the idea. This would be achieved by levying the tax for the moment in kind, in the form of obligatory amounts of prescribed products, but in future cash was supposed to take the place of these deliveries.

The Commissioners came, after long study, to a variant of Raffles' landrente, that was based on a mixture of individual and communal tenure of the land that was formally owned by the government. Every dessa head would parcel out the land allotted to the dessa among individual members of the community. These tenants would till the land as a kind of sharecroppers and pay the government an in-kind tax in the form of a percentage of the harvest. The tax was based on the principle of admodiation. (Note: A method of levying taxation on the basis of a prior estimate. The Dutch word admodiatie is derived from the French amodier: to give out land to farm it for a periodic fee in cash or kind.) The estimated size of the harvest to be taxed was a matter of negotiation between the dessa head and the tax collector. In this context the Malay word tahar (to haggle) comes to mind.

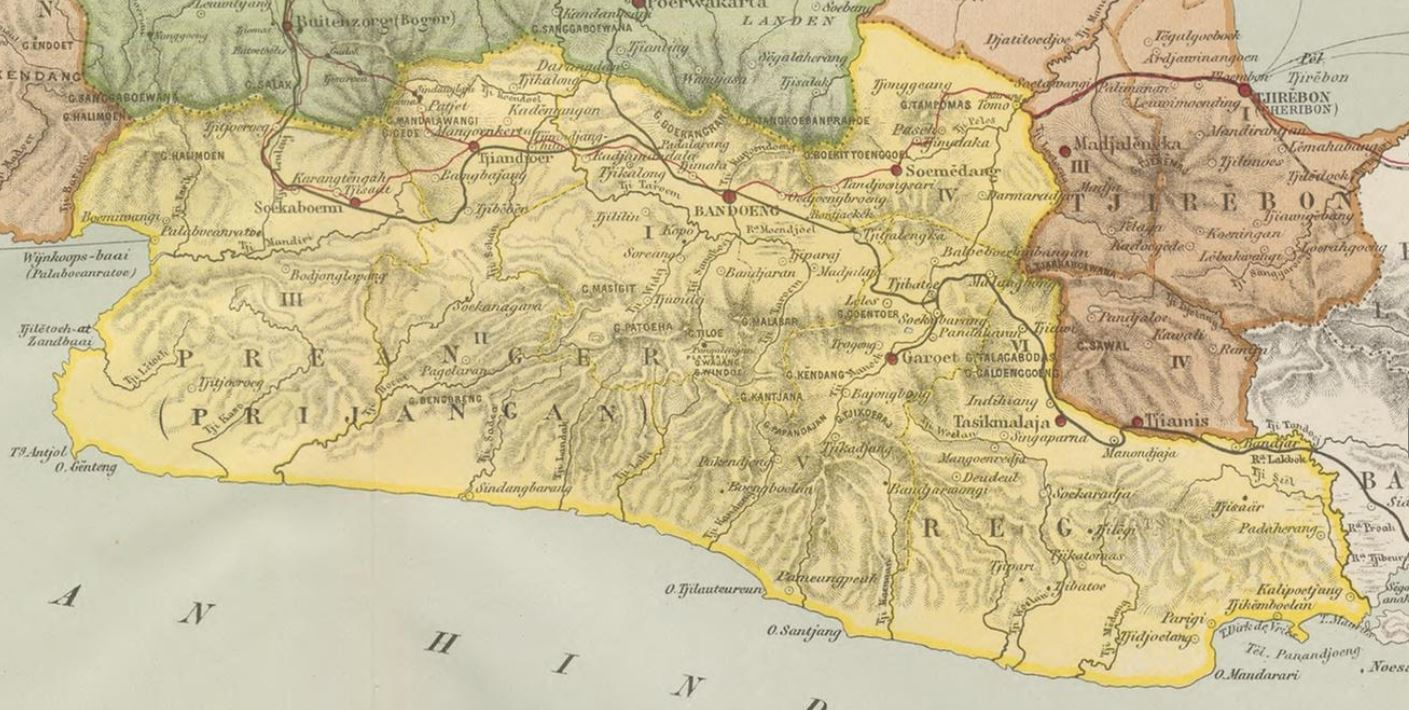
Preanger region

An ancillary source of revenue for the East Indies government was the leasing of coffee plantations in the Preanger region of West-Java to the local population. The VOC had introduced the cultivation of coffee at the turn of the 18th century, and it had become a very profitable quasi-monopoly for a time. The Commissioners sought to give this cultivation a new lease on life by introducing a system that gave Javanese outside the Preanger region an incentive to engage in it. The government of the East Indies would henceforth lease out plantations to local village dwellers (with exclusion of Europeans and ethnic Chinese as Raffles had allowed) and not individually, but to entire dessas, for fixed terms. In no way the use of coercion was to be allowed (as had been the practice under Daendels). In the Preanger region the old system as it had been instituted under the British would be continued. One of the considerations of the Commissioners was that it would motivate the Javanese to engage in the cultivation of coffee if they were guaranteed the fruits of their labor. The plantations would be leased for 6-year terms to entire dessas that would collectively be responsible for the cultivation, including the replacement of diseased trees, and perform new planting to an extent of one-sixth of the existing acreage. They would have to follow the directions of a governmental botanical service. The rent would vary according to the quality of the plants, following a tariff that conformed to the landrente tariff. The rent could be paid in kind or in cash. If in cash the rent would be calculated according to a price that would be annually determined. In this way a cultivation that was once subject to coercion, was transformed to a form of free agriculture under market conditions. The stated purpose was to protect the population from arbitrary treatment; to improve their circumstances; to guarantee them the fruits of their labor; and to treat them on the same footing as other subjects of the king.

When it came to the implementation of the new system of taxation the Commissioners had to reckon with one practical: problem: the collection of the landrente had stagnated since the departure of the British in 1816. There were therefore large arrears of taxes owed, so large even that in some cases the arrears were equal to the annual harvest. The Commissioners therefore decided to remit the taxes for the years since 1816 by a decree they issued in early 1819. Doing otherwise might have caused great hardship for the population, and possibly have led to riots or worse. But this remission had dire consequences for the financial situation of the colony. And the delay in implementation also made it impossible to sense the acceptance of the new system under the Regents and the common population.

Finally, in this context of the general economy of Java in particular, the Commissioners promulgated a number of important regulations. So were immigrating Europeans no longer freely admitted, but had they to obtain permission from the Governor General to become residents. The development of jungle areas (for instance by logging the forests) was no longer freely permitted to Europeans either. And the slave trade (already prohibited by the British, and proscribed in the Convention of London), was formally outlawed. Not so, however, the institution of slavery itself, as this was deemed to be unacceptable to both Europeans and the indigenous population, who prized slavery as in accordance with adat. (Note: In this context, Oranje mentions the following anecdote. The Radja of Buleleng, Bali tried to bribe Van der Capellen by giving him the use of three beautiful slave girls. Van der Capellen, embarrassed by this gift, thought it politic not to refuse, but he immediately manumitted the girls and made sure they got paid work as house servants in colonist families. He of course reported the "gift" to his colleagues) The Commissioners, however, continued the policy instituted by the British to promote the gradual abolition of slavery by way of a "Java Benevolent Society" to aid the manumitted slaves.

==== The coinage ====
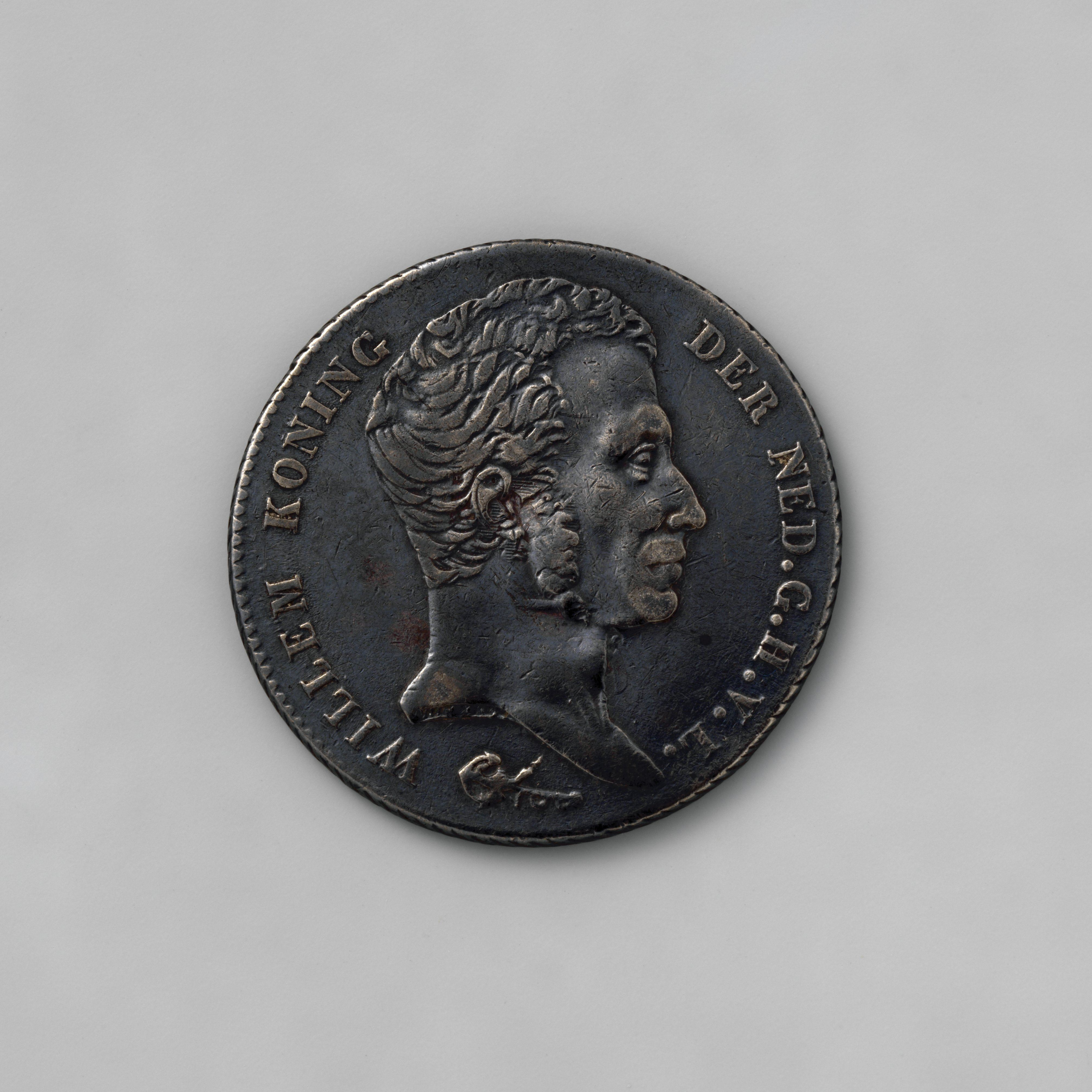
A Netherlands Indies gulden, 1821 (Note: Obverse: bust of King William I; reverse: Dutch coat of arms between value indication of "1" and "G"; year 1821 above value-indication.)

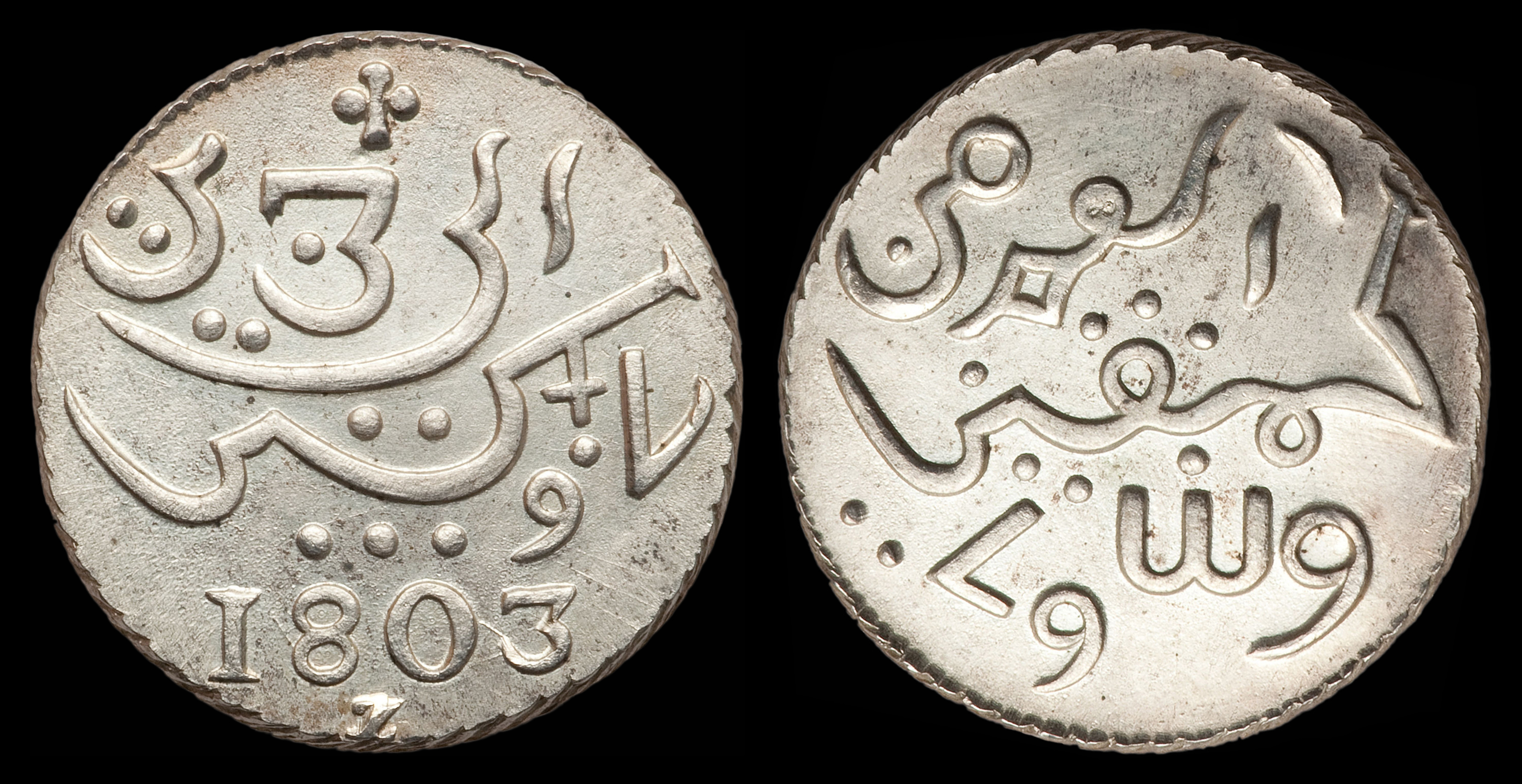
East Indies Java 'rupee, circulating next to the Netherlands Indies gulden

At their arrival the Commissioners encountered total chaos in the field of the coinage. All kinds of coins circulated, leaving it to the market to determine the exchange rates, which in turn hindered the free circulation of money, and economic activity in general. There also was simply too little money, both coins and paper money, in circulation to serve the economy adequately. Let alone to make the transition from a barter economy to a money economy feasible. Apart from this the Commissioners had received the instruction to erect a monetary union between the Netherlands and the Dutch East Indies. In short, the regulation of the coinage was a priority.

The Commissioners started with establishing a new standard coin or currency unit, the Indische gulden (Netherlands Indies gulden). This was a silver coin with the same face value as the silver Dutch guilder. The problem was that silver bullion was 20% more expensive in the Indies than in the Netherlands. Using the same silver content would therefore make the Dutch guilder 20% less valuable in the Indies, and therefore subject to Gresham's law drive the Indies guilder out of circulation. The Commissioner's therefore had to think of a ruse to debase the Indies guilder to such an extent that the intrinsic value of the two coins would be about equal. The solution was to abuse the fact that the subdivision of both guilders was 16 stuivers. However the exchange rate between the Indies stuiver and the Dutch stuiver was 20:16. By setting the intrinsic value of the Indies guilder at 16 Indies stuivers, instead of 16 Dutch stuivers, the problem was therefore solved.

An additional problem that one of the other coins circulating, especially under the indigenous population, was a local form of the rupee. The intrinsic value of this coin was less than that of the new guilder. The Commissioners used this as an argument not to adopt "rupee' as the name for the standard coin. The rupee was also the denomination of the local paper money, which had a bad reputation. Adopting another name than rupee would therefore prevent the new money to suffer from the bad reputation of the old.

The Indies guilder would be divided into 120 duiten, or 30 stuivers, reflecting the lesser value of the Indies guilder, as the intrinsic value of the Dutch guilder was 24 stuivers. This required however, that to avoid a factual lowering of government salaries, the exchange rate for the calculation of Indies salaries would be 25 stuivers for the guilder, or 100 duiten for each Dutch guilder.

The Commissioners had brought along 2 million Dutch guilders in specie to guarantee the value of paper money. The same amount of paper money was now issued. This helped anchor the value of the paper money in circulation. For every type of money metal (like copper and zinc) the exact value was established in terms of duiten. The issue of coins made of such other metals against a face value that did not reflect the intrinsic value was prohibited. Counterfeiting was made a capital offense. Paper money issued by the British was now taken out of circulation, as there was enough money available to finance this. Paper money issued under the Daendels regime, on the other hand, was disavowed. It lost what little value it might still have had.

In his 1819 report Elout concluded that the reform of the monetary system in 1817 had been a success. The issue of silver Indies guilders had been disappointing, but on the other hand the coining of silver rupees had been very successful, and thanks to the fixed exchange rate with the guilder this achieved the same purpose. (Note: The coinage of copper duiten had an unexpected side-effect. The copper used for those coins was originally imported from Japan (i.e. via Dejima), but the supply was insufficient. In addition Javanese people often melted the coins to fashion copper implements from them, so there was a dearth of coins. This was relieved by importing copper blanks from the Netherlands, which had a lower intrinsic value, bringing the Batavia mint an unexpected profit from seigniorage)

==== Colonial Administration and Judicial Organisation ====
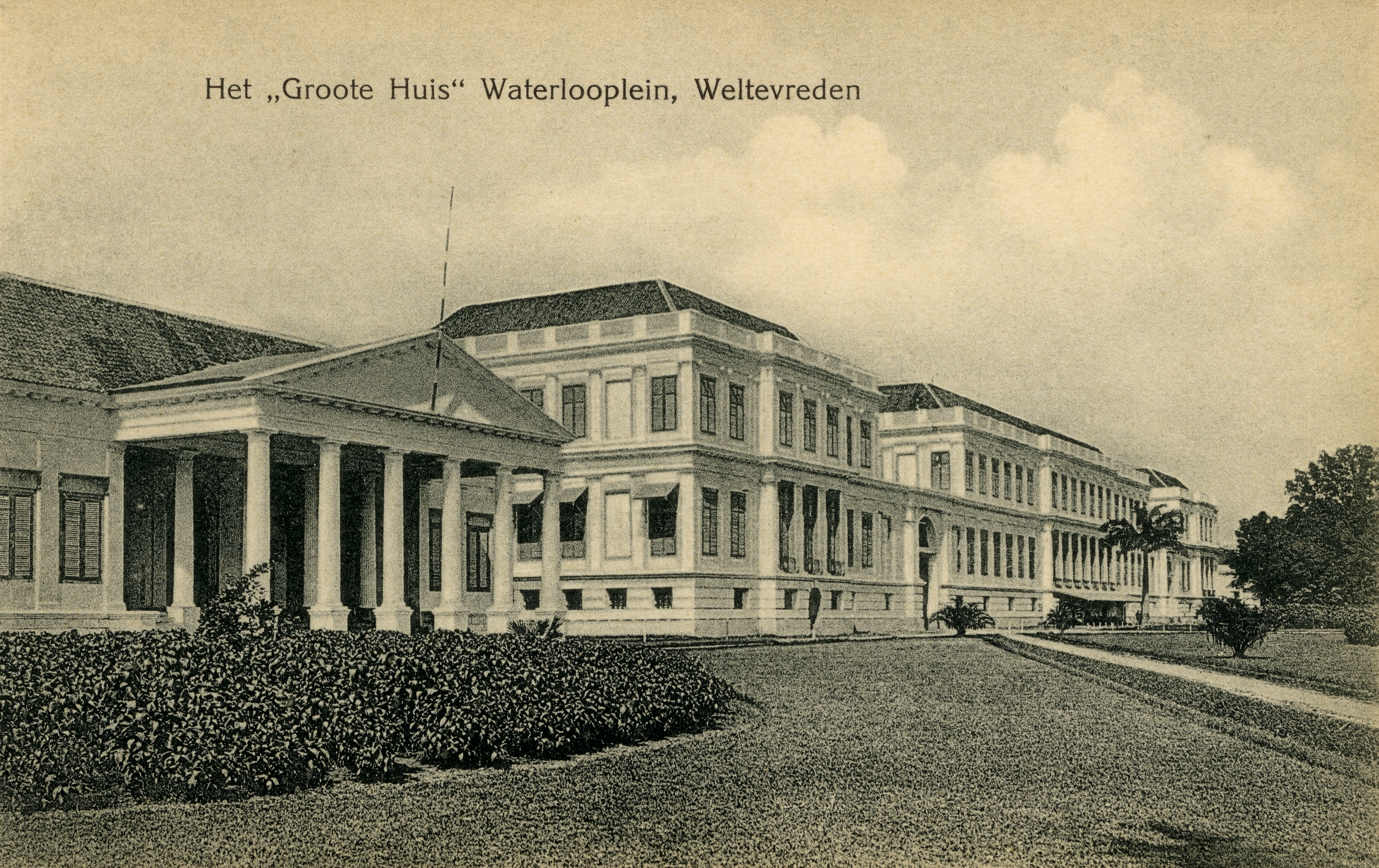
Building of the Hooggerechtshof (Supreme Court) of the Dutch East Indies in Batavia

The Commissioners decided to leave the administrative division of Java into residencies that Daendels had instituted in place. (Note: See for how this eventually worked out for the entire archipelago Administrative divisions of the Dutch East Indies.) At the head of each residency stood the Resident (directly responsible to the Governor General), often deputized by assistent-residents, who headed the administrative organisation and colonial official corps. He was responsible for the government of the residency and the maintenance of law and order. He was therefore also the chief of police, and presiding magistrate for criminal and civil cases regarding the indigenous population, administering the adat cases that pertained to them. (Note: But he was assisted by indigenous judges in the courts (under the name of landraden) that administered the adat laws) The Residents could also make local ordinances. Furthermore, they headed the financial administration of the residency and were responsible for drafting its budget. The management of infrastructure, especially the hydraulic management for the residency, was another responsibility (under the supervision of the Chief Inspector for Water Management in Batavia). The position of the Regents and their remuneration was also codified in accordance with the new legal fiction that they were no longer sovereign in their fiefs, but subject to the Dutch king and his representatives in the colony. The position of the Governors and Residents in the areas in the archipelago that were not under direct rule was similar, with the proviso that these had to deal with sovereign Indonesian princes (like the Sultan of Aceh), or European powers (like the Portuguese settlements in East Timor), which introduced an aspect of the maintenance of appropriate foreign relations. Also, the Regents in these areas (like the Sultanate of Banjar and the Pontianak Sultanate) were generally more autonomous than the Regents on Java, so the relationship was characterized as indigenous Princes being "advised" by the Resident, not an explicit hierarchical relationship, therefore. The landrente was also not collected in these areas.

The appointment of Residents and Regents, and all other colonial officials, was to be the competence of the Hoge Regering (High Government) of the Dutch East Indies, i.e. the Governor General, "in council", or acting on his own authority. The only exception to this appointment competence regarded the heads of the dessas, who were henceforth "to be elected by the population", according to existing customs. It was the intent of the Commissioners not to interfere in the constitutional arrangements of the indigenous population, just to protect them from abuses by the Regents.

For the benefit of the colonial officials a pension fund was founded, as well as an orphanage for the children of deceased personnel; and the administration of estates of deceased personnel organised. The rules for the organisation of the corps of colonial officials were made part of the new Regeringsreglement.

The Commissioners built on the existing Judicial Organisation and Law. That law was codified under the VOC in the so-called Bataviasche Statuten (Statutes of Batavia). (Note: This was a codification of Roman-Dutch law; it was continually updated by the jurisprudence in the Dutch courts.) That codex was only applicable to Europeans; its jurisdiction was not to be extended to the indigenous population that would remain subject to adat. (Note: The law in the Netherlands itself was in flux at the time. Napoleon had introduced his Napoleonic Code only recently, and though it was the intent of the new Dutch government to replace it with a number of codes of Dutch origin, this turned out to take decades. In any case, Dutch subjects were supposed to have the benefit of the law in the home country.) They codified a number of regulations, however. An Instruction for the Hooggerechtshof (Supreme Court) of the Dutch East Indies was promulgated, together with one for the Raden van Justitie (Appellate Courts), as were instructions for bailiffs and wardens of jails. A code of criminal procedure and one for the conduct of civil cases for Europeans was promulgated, together with a separate code for criminal procedures against indigenous people, and finally the geographical division of jurisdictions was determined. Similar arrangements were made for courts-martial and the High Military Court.

==== The 1818 Regeringsreglement ====
When the Commissioners General departed from Texel in late 1815, they carried along two important documents, a draft Regeringsreglement for the East Indies, and an Instruction. The first had all the external characteristics of a constitution, but lacked one defining characteristic: it was intended to bind the authorities in the colony, but not the metropolitan government that would ultimately promulgate it; the latter could (and would) diverge from it with the stroke of a quill, if necessary. To express this the term Regeringsreglement, which can be translated as "Regulation for the government," was used, and not the term Grondwet (Constitution). The Instruction in many respects overlapped with the draft-regulation, but its intent was to function as a regulation for this specific provisional government, that the Commissioners General, seen as a collective, were also to be for the colony. The draft reglement could have been promulgated before their departure, but this was left intentionally to their discretion, as the authorities in Patria had long been deprived of direct contact with the authorities in the colony, and king William therefore deemed it prudent to let the Commissioners take the true state of affairs into account, and act according to circumstances. And that is what they did, leaving much of what they found (like the high-handed change in constitutional fiction that Daendels had brought about, and thankfully adopted by Raffles, namely that the European king, whether he was called Napoleon, or George, or William, was the legitimate "owner" of the Indonesian soil, and the inhabitants his "tenants") in place. They sometimes improved on that (e.g. the reforms of Raffles landrente tax, and of the coffee-plantation regime). At other times they changed it (as with the lifting of the monopolies on the spice trade). In yet other circumstances they created something entirely new (like the system of the coinage). The organisation of the colonial civil service and the judicial organisation they mainly codified as they found it (in perfected form). All of this was cast in the form of a number of separate regulations, promulgated over the time of their sojourn in the Indies. But now, at the end of 1818, came the time to put it all together in the form of a definite Regeringsreglement. And also put the capstone on the edifice they had built, in the form of a regulation of the "government" in the narrow sense of ruling officials and their competences.

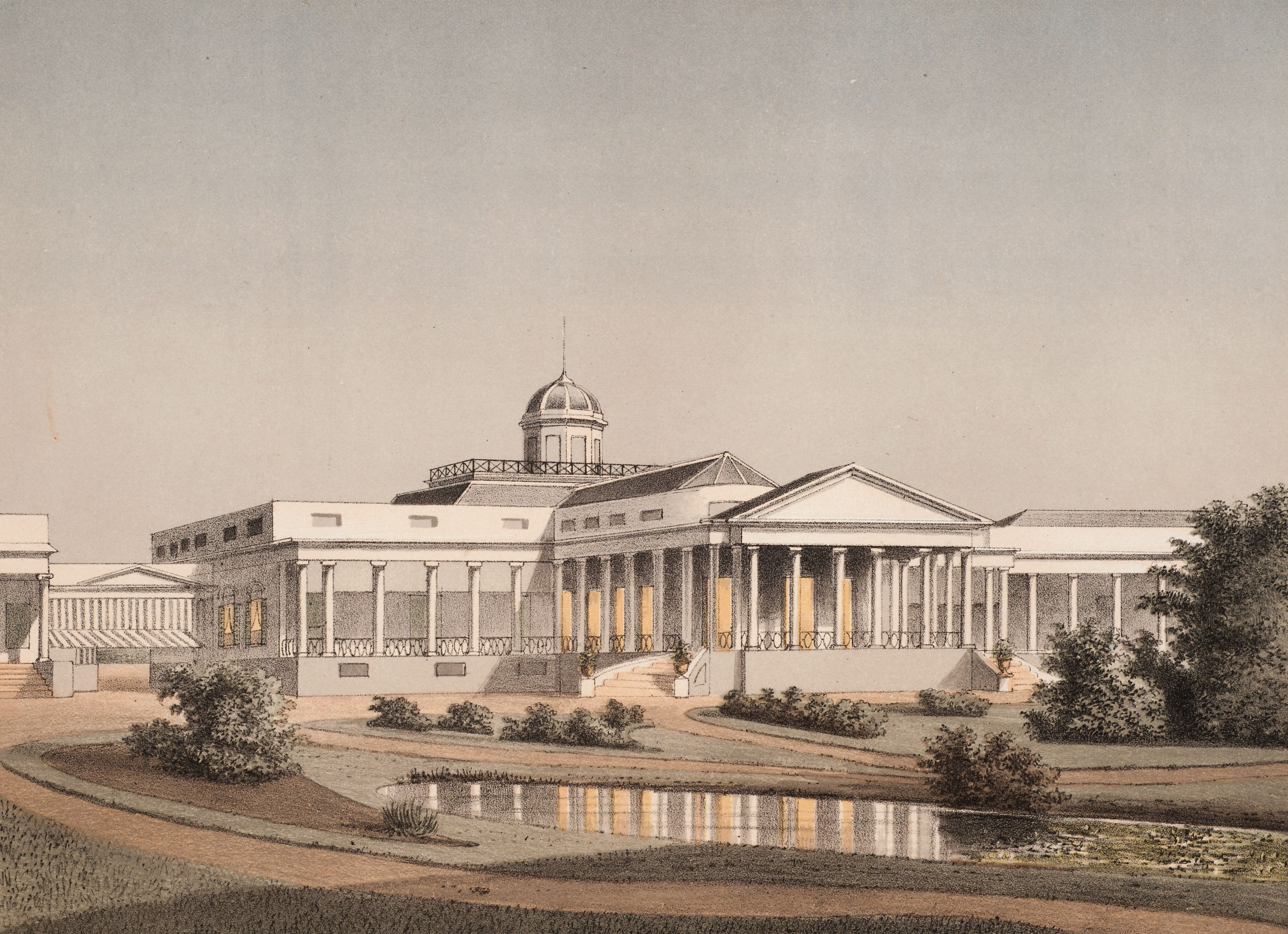
The palace of the Governor General in Buitenzorg by Josias Cornelis Rappard

The Regeringsreglement as it was eventually drafted had the following layout:

First chapter: Of the Governor General and the High Government
Second chapter: Of the Judiciary
Third Chapter: Of the Internal Administration
Fourth chapter: Of Public Finance and its Administration
Fifth chapter: General Provisions (Note: Oranje devotes a chapter to a comparison between the text of the draft of 1815 and the eventual text of 1818)

The High Government (Hoge Regering) was to consist of the Governor General "in council", or acting alone. The Council in question were four so-called Raden van Indië (Councilors of the Indies (Note: The Council of the Indies had since 1610 under the VOC been a check on the powers of the Governor General. Daendels had done away with it, but the Commissioners General now resurrected the ancient institution, be it with diminished powers.)) who together with the Governor General were to form this Hoge Regering. (Note: The Regeringsreglement that the Commissioners promulgated in 1818 also opened the possibility of appointing a lieutenant-Governor-General, though this was not a permanent position. This "deputy" would also be a member of the Hoge Regering.) The Hoge Regering was to be the highest executive and legislative authority in the Dutch East indies. (Note: There was no notion of a Separation of powers, except with respect to the judiciary, that was to be independent.) This encompassed the powers normally exercised by the sovereign of a country, with the proviso that the Hoge Regering in everything acted as the representative of the king, who was the ultimate authority. This included foreign relations (i.e. concluding treaties); military affairs; legislation, but also dispensation of laws; financial administration and levying of taxes; execution of punishments and giving pardons; special police powers (such as deporting of undesirable persons), and immigration and settlement matters; and so on, again with the proviso that the Hoge Regering had to report on all relevant matters to the government in Patria on a quarterly basis, which implied the possibility that the king would overrule measures or policies. The Hoge Regering was to be supported by a General Secretariat that would be seated in the administrative capital of Buitenzorg in the Buitenzorg Residency.

The High Government was advised and checked by three state organs, comparable to the Dutch High Councils of State: the General Audit Chamber, the Council of Finance, and a Receiver General for the Public Finances, for which instructions had been formulated earlier and these were left out of the Regeringsreglement, just like the instructions for the Judiciary. These instructions could be seen as organic laws, elaborating the Regeringsreglement, even though they preceded the Reglement chronologically. (Note: There had also been an Advisory Council comparable to the Council of State, but this state organ was not continued in the Regeringsreglement.)

The organisation of the bureaucratic apparatus that would serve the Hoge Regering in Batavia, followed in large lines the set-up of the Hoge Regering itself: There was to be a Chief Director, comparable to the Governor General, as chief of the bureaucracy. Under him functioned the chiefs of the government departments (called "directors") who had the same kind of secretarial support as the three controlling councils.

A general government department that merits mention is that of Religion, Education and Arts and Sciences (Note: The Netherlands did not have a State religion, but the position of the Dutch Reformed Church came close. As the "public church" it was supported by the Dutch state, also in the Dutch East Indies. On the other hand it had been the policy of the VOC to practice tolerance toward other religions, and to discourage proselytization. These policies were continued by the Commissioners General.) The Commissioners General had (in accordance with their Instruction) also set up a system of regulation of basic education. Private Primary schools were subject to permits from the Governor General, and to an inspectorate that monitored the quality of education they provided. They were to be open to children of both genders, for Europeans and Indo people, as well as children of Javanese parents who wished their children to attend. This system was for the moment brought under the management of the director of agriculture, Reinwardt, who played many roles in this period. He was also director of the Botanical Gardens in Buitenzorg, which he had founded, and which played an important role in agricultural education.

With the promulgation, subject to homologation by king William, of this Regeringsreglement the Commissioners General completed their mission. The only thing that rested was to appoint the people who would lead the new, permanent government. The Commissioners confirmed their colleague Van der Capellen in his function of Governor General. As Members of the Council of the Indies the Commissioners General appointed: P.T. Chassé, J.A. van Braam, Herman Warner Muntinghe, and R. d'Ozy (who had been the secretary of the Commissioners General).

== Aftermath ==
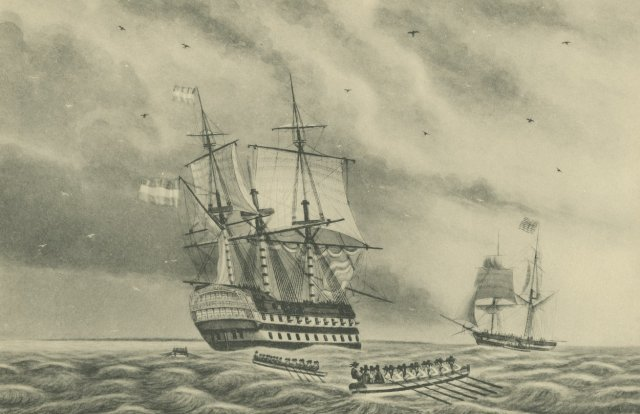
Zr. Ms.Admiraal Evertsen just before foundering near Diego Garcia in 1819 by Q.M.R. Ver Huell

Having finished their business Elout and Buyskes left Batavia in March 1819 aboard Zr. Ms. Admiraal Evertsen, still under the command of captain-lieutenant Ver Huell. Also on board was a big hoard of priceless botanical specimens collected by Reinwardt intended for the Hortus Botanicus Leiden. The Evertsen was a badly constructed ship (like her sister ships that had accompanied her to the Indies and had mostly already been condemned because of their state of unreadiness). Near the island of Diego Garcia the ship had become so leaky that the crew had to man the pumps 24 hours a day. It was clear that the ship would founder before long, so Buyskes (despite overstepping his role as a mere passenger) ordered Ver Huell to sail to Diego Garcia. There the ship proved unable to cross the barrier reef, so Buyskes (against the wishes of Ver Huell) ordered "abandon ship". The passengers and crew were rescued by an American brig, the Pickering, that happened to lie in the lagoon. But the cargo was lost. Elout lost all his precious diaries with a record of all the activities of the Commissioners. After his return to the Netherlands he spent weeks reconstructing this record from memory.

Van der Capellen remained behind to try and implement the policies he and his colleagues had developed. He tried to continue the policy of protecting the indigenous people by barring Europeans and ethnic Chinese from the cultivation of coffee. He also partly restored the rights of the Regents, that had been eliminated with a stroke of the pen by Daendels, which had caused great resentment. The Commissioners had also naively supposed that the Regents would compensate their subjects for the imposition of the landrente by scaling back their own demands for tribute. This proved illusory. So Van der Capellen in 1824 forced a number of Regents to disgorge their extorted gains. He was also not popular among the old, corrupt elite in Batavia around the former Governor General Johannes Siberg, known as the Oudgastenpartij. These Europeans sabotaged him wherever possible. His time in office was also marred by armed conflicts with indigenous rulers, like the First expedition to Palembang (1819), Second expedition to Palembang (1821), Padri War (1821-1837), Expedition to the West Coast of Borneo (1823), First Bone War (1824-1825), and especially the Java War with Prince Diponegoro that started during his tenure in office. In all these conflicts the Royal Netherlands East Indies Army that evolved from the Indies Brigade that had come with the Commissioners General to the East Indies, played a major role. Van der Capellen was relieved from office in 1826 and succeeded by Leonard du Bus de Gisignies.

The Anglo-Dutch Treaty of 1824 settled a number of questions that had been left open by the 1814 treaty. Its main result was a more precise demarcation of spheres of interest in the Indonesian archipelago and British Malaya. The Dutch ceded their interests in Malaya and Singapore in exchange for a free hand on the island of Sumatra, especially British Bencoolen and Biliton. The British for the time being acquiesced in their being de facto barred from the Moluccas. The treaty was negotiated by the Dutch ambassador at the Court of St James's, Anton Reinhard Falck, without any apparent input of Van der Capellen.

In the longer term the costs of the conflicts on Java and the disappointing revenues of the landrente motivated the Dutch government, that had revived the policy of the batig slot (colonial surplus) of the VOC, to replace the landrente with the far more coercive Cultuurstelsel, which soured the relationships with the indigenous population even more, necessitating ever more repressive policies. (Note: The policy was instituted by Governor-General Johannes van den Bosch over the objections of Elout, who was Minister of Colonies, and so nominally Van den Bosch's superior, at the time. Van den Bosch prevailed, and Elout resigned in protest.)

== Sources ==
- Blok, P.J.; Molhuysen, P.C., eds. (1921). "Anthing, Carl Heinrich Wilhelm". Nieuw Nederlandsch biografisch woordenboek (DNBL) (in Dutch). Sijthoff. pp. 20–24.
- Burgers, H. (2011). "De Garoeda en de Ooievaar. Indonesië van kolonie tot nationale staat. Verhandelingen van het Koninklijk Instituut voor Taal-, Land-, en Volkenkunde 266" (PDF) (in Dutch). Leiden: KITLV Uitgeverij.
- Jong, C.G.F. de (2015). "A Footnote to the Colonial History of the Dutch East Indies. The "Little East" in the first half of the nineteenth century". Researchgate.net.
- Kemp, P.H. van der (1) (1916). "Gedachtenisrede over Indië's Teruggave in 1816". Vereeniging "Moederland en Koloniën" (in Dutch). 16: 1–32.
- Kemp, P.H. van der (2) (1912). "Het herstel van het Nederlandsch gezag in de Molukken in 1817, naar oorspronkelijke stukken. DERDE GEDEELTE. De bedwinging van den opstand in de Molukken door schout-bij-nacht Buijskes". Bijdragen tot de Taal-, Land- en Volkenkunde van Nederlandsch-Indië (in Dutch). 66 (1): 1, 3–167. JSTOR 20769637.
- Kemp, P.H. van der (3) (1901). Brieven van en aan Mr. H.J. van der Graaff 1816-1826. Eene bijdrage tot de kennis der Oost-Indische bestuurstoestanden onder de regeering van G.A.G.P. baron van der Capellen. Eerste deel. Geschiedkundig overzicht (Verhandelingen van het Bataviaasch Genootschap van Kunsten en Wetenschappen Deel LII) (in Dutch). 's-Gravenhage: Martinus Nijhoff.
- Oranje, D.J.P. (1936). "Het beleid der Commissie Generaal; de uitwerking der beginselen van 1815 in het Regeerings Reglement van 1818 (dissertation)". bibliotheek.nl (in Dutch). Utrecht.
- Reinwardt, C.G.C.; Muller, F. (1858). "Reis naar het oostelijk gedeelte van den Indischen archipel, in het jaar 1821". Google Books (in Dutch).
- Ver Huel, Q.M.R. (1835). Herinneringen van eene reis naar de Oost-Indien. Eerste Deel (in Dutch). Haarlem: Vincent Loosjes.
- Vries, Jan de; Woude, Ad van der (1997). The First Modern Economy: Success, Failure, and Perseverance of the Dutch Economy, 1500–1815. Cambridge University Press. ISBN 0-521-57061-1.
