= Reinier d'Ozy =

Dutch colonial administrator

Raad van Indië (Note: Member of the High Government of the Dutch East Indies)
- In office 1819–1827 Serving with Godert van der Capellen, Herman Warner Muntinghe, Petrus Theodorus Chassé, Jacob Andries van Braam
- Succeeded by: J.J. Melville van Carnbee

Personal details
- Born: Reinier d'Ozy; 15 April 1773 Steenwijk
- Died: 1 March 1827 (aged 53) Noorder Rassen near Westkapelle
- Spouse: Maria Philippina Meurs
- Children: Henrietta Maria d'Ozy; Helena Jacoba d'Ozy
- Parents: Abraham Hendrik d'Ozy (father); Titia Kiers (mother)

Reinier d'Ozy (also Dozy, or d'Ozij) (Steenwijk, 15 April 1773 - at Sea, near Westkapelle, 1 March 1827) was a Dutch colonial administrator who rose to be a member of the High Government of the Dutch East Indies.

== Life ==
=== Personal life ===
D'Ozy was the son of Abraham Hendrik d'Ozy, lieutenant of the regiment Hessen-Cassel, and Titia Kiers. He married Maria Philippina Meurs, with whom he had two daughters: Henrietta Maria and Helena Jacoba.

=== Career ===
After first having spent some years at the office of his cousin, the Leiden civil-law notary JP Klinkenberg Dozy, d'Ozy accompanied his elder brother Roelof Jacobus in 1791 to China, where he did up the experience that qualified him to be a secretary of the embassy of Isaac Titsingh, Andreas Everardus van Braam Houckgeest, and Chrétien-Louis-Joseph de Guignes to the court of the Qianlong Emperor in 1794–1795. (Note: There he must have met Jacob Andries van Braam, his future colleague in the High Government of the Dutch East Indies, though the difference in social status may have prevented them from becoming friends.) In 1796 he went to the Dutch Cape Colony that was returned to Dutch authority in 1803 after the Peace of Amiens. He was appointed secretary of the local desolate boedelkamer (Note: The court that dealt with insolvent estates at the Cape of Good Hope, especially under the rule of the VOC.) by governor Jacob Abraham de Mist. When the latter was replaced by Jan Willem Janssens d'Ozy was appointed the governor's secret secretary, and later promoted to second government secretary.

In 1804 Janssens entrusted d'Ozy with a confidential mission regarding the colony to the government of the Batavian Republic at The Hague, which he fulfilled wo the satisfaction of the Asiatic Council of the Staatsbewind and Grand Pensionary Rutger Jan Schimmelpenninck.

When d'Ozy returned to the Cape in April, 1806, he was unaware that the colony had again fallen into the hands of the British. He was arrested by the enemy and his goods were confiscated. The British valued his talents, however, and offered him rich rewards if he would defect to them. D'Ozy refused, and was put on a ship bound for the Netherlands (by then the Kingdom of Holland). King Louis Bonaparte offered him a position at the departmental government of Maasland (Note: What would later become Bouches-de-la-Meuse under the First French Empire.) in June, 1807, and made him head of the Department of the Navy and Colonies in August, 1808.

After the French had left in 1813 and the independence of the Netherlands had been restored he was appointed secretary of the Commissioners-General of the Dutch East Indies on 18 December 1814, and left with them aboard the squadron of Rear-Admiral Arnold Adriaan Buyskes on 30 October 1815, for the East Indies, where they were to take over the colony from the British under the terms of the Anglo-Dutch Treaty of 1814. He worked diligently as the right hand of Commissioners-General Godert van der Capellen and Cornelis Theodorus Elout and in 1818 he was made their secretary-general. In 1819 came the final reward, when he was appointed as one of the four members of the new Council of the Indies, and hence of the High Government of the Indies.

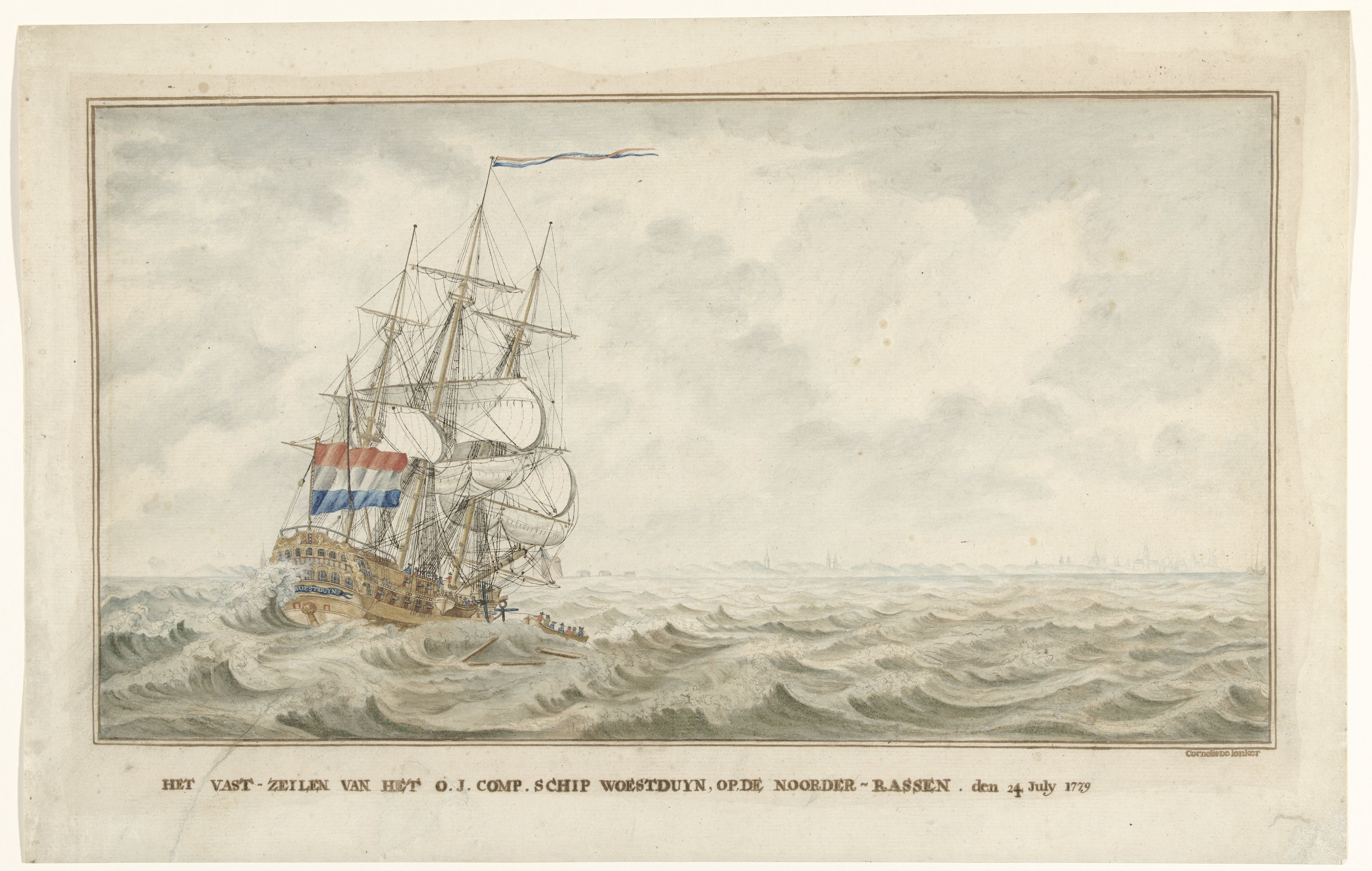
The Noorder Rassen were a well-known ship's graveyard. (Note: The shipwreck of the ship Woestduin that foundered there in 1779)

In 1824 governor-General Van der Capellen became embroiled in a scandal which would cause his downfall. D'Ozy was recalled by Commissioner-General Leonard du Bus de Gisignies to the Netherlands, together with his colleague Hendrik Jan van de Graaff, to give evidence and to be made to account for his own conduct in the matter. He made the voyage home aboard the ship Java Paket (capt. H. Kortemeijer), which foundered on 1 March 1827, on the Noorder Rassen in the Deurlo (near Westkapelle). D'Ozy and his daughter Helena Jacoba, and a number of other passengters, drowned in this accident.

== Sources ==
- Aa, A. J. van der, ed. (1878). "Reinier D'Ozij". Biografisch Woordenboek der Nederlanden. Bijvoegssel (DBNL) (in Dutch). p. 232.
- Blok, P.J.; Molhuysen, P.C., eds. (1930). "Dozy, Reinier". Nieuw Nederlandsch biografisch woordenboek (DBNL) (in Dutch). Sijthoff. pp. 428–429.
