= Petrus Theodorus Chassé =

Dutch colonial administrator (1758–1831)

Chief trader Dejima
- In office 1790–1792
- Preceded by: Hendrik Casper Romberg
- Succeeded by: Gijsbert Hemmij

Governor of Dutch Celebes
- In office 1800–1811

Raad van Indië (Note: Member of the High Government of the Dutch East Indies)
- In office 1819–1830 Serving with Godert van der Capellen, Herman Warner Muntinghe, Jacob Andries van Braam, Reinier d'Ozy
- Preceded by: New Creation
- Succeeded by: P. Merkus

Personal details
- Born: Petrus Theodorus Chassé; 30 November 1758 Varsseveld
- Died: 21 July 1831 (aged 72) Batavia
- Spouse: Anna Elisabeth Palm (m. 1789)
- Relatives: David Hendrik Chassé (brother)
- Profession: VOC Chief merchant

Petrus Theodorus baron Chassé (30 November 1758 – 21 July 1831) was a Dutch colonial administrator, who was opperhoofd of Dejima under the VOC and governor of Dutch Celebes at Makassar under the Batavian Republic, and who ultimately became a member of the High Government of the Dutch East Indies.

== Life ==
=== Personal life ===
Chassé was the son of Carel Johan Chassé and Maria Helena Johanna Schull, and the brother of David Hendrik Chassé. He married Anna Elisabeth Palm in 1789. They got the following children: Carolina Maria Frederica Chassé (1794), Johannes Theodorus Chassé (1795), Wijnandina Elisabeth Henriëtte Chassé (1802), Anna Petronella Elisabeth Chassé (1804), Juliana Cornelia Theodora Chassé (1805), and Petrus Henricus baron Chassé (1806).

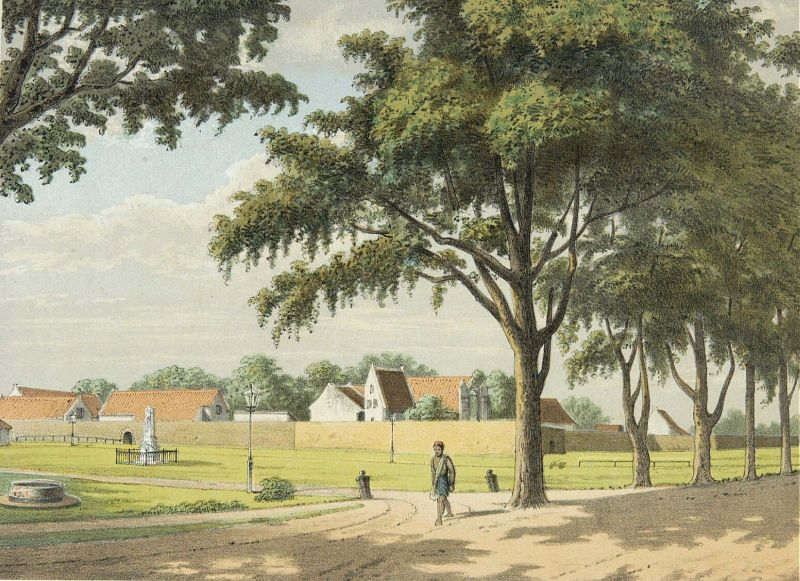
Fort Rotterdam, the seat of the governor of Dutch Celebes when Chassé was governor

=== Career ===
Chassé entered the service of the VOC at a young age and made a rapid career. He reached the rank of opperkoopman (Chief merchant). He was opperhoofd (Chief trader) of the VOC trading post in Dejima from 13 November 1790 to 13 November 1792. He became governor of Dutch Celebes at Makassar in 1800, where (after the Peace of Amiens) he proposed to open a free port there to Governor-General Johannes Siberg in 1803, but this suggestion was not followed up, due to the resumption of hostilities between the Batavian Republic and Great Britain in that year. He remained in that office for twelve years. Under Governor-General Herman Willem Daendels he was made Director-General of the government in Java, and a member of the Council of the Indies. After the British takeover in 1811 he lost that post, but after the restoration of Dutch power under the Commissioners-General of the Dutch East Indies in August, 1816, he was sent to Celebes as a commissioner to take over that island from British control (under the Anglo-Dutch Treaty of 1814). Afterwards he fulfilled a number of other important missions, which earned him the praise of Commissioner-General Cornelis Theodorus Elout. (Note: Elout wrote: "...he was one of those former employees of the VOC who were precise researchers and impartial judges of what in earlier and later days was done by others and by themselves.") In 1819 he was appointed to the new Council of the Indies that together with Governor-General Godert van der Capellen formed the High Government of the Dutch East Indies.

He survived the other members of the High Government, (Note: Even though he was the eldest by a decade, while Van Braam, d'Ozy and Muntinghe were almost the same age, and Chassé only two years older than they.) Herman Warner Muntinghe, Reinier d'Ozy and Jacob Pieter van Braam, who were appointed at the same time, and retired in 1830. King William I of the Netherlands then created him Baron, just like his brother David had been. He died on 21 July 1831 in Batavia.

== Sources ==
- Mijer, P. (1878). Jean Chrétien Baud geschetst (in Dutch). Kemink & Zoon. p. 102.
