= Pieter Gerardus van Overstraten =

First governor-general of Dutch East Indies

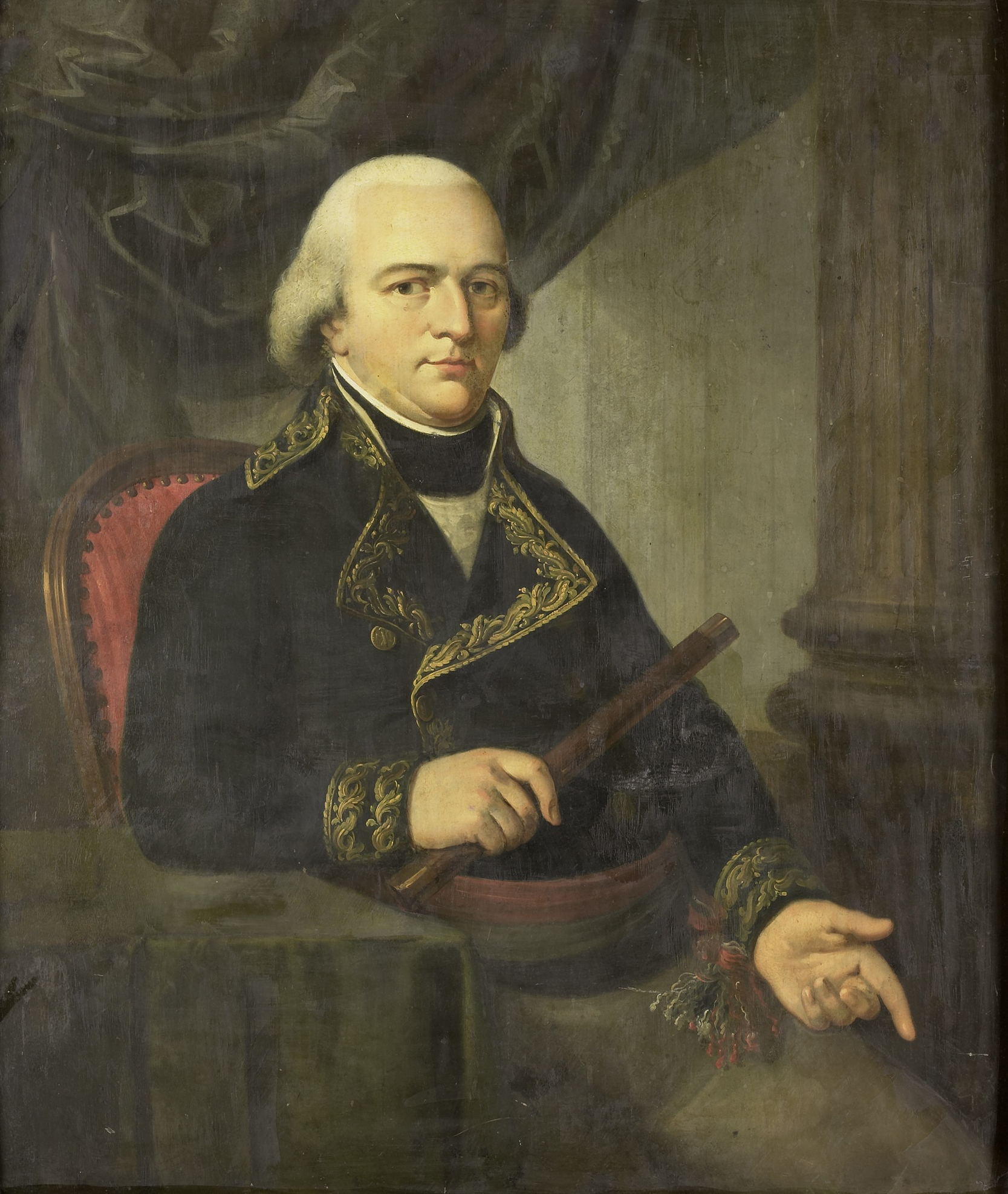
- Anonymous portrait, c. 1802–1820

Governor-General of the Dutch East Indies
- In office 16 August 1796 – 22 August 1801
- Appointed by: Batavian Republic
- Preceded by: Willem Arnold Alting
- Succeeded by: Johannes Siberg

Personal details
- Born: 19 February 1755 Bergen op Zoom, Dutch Republic
- Died: 22 August 1801 (aged 46) Batavia, Dutch East Indies (present‑day Indonesia)

Pieter Gerardus van Overstraten (19 February 1755 – 22 August 1801) was Governor-General of the Dutch East Indies from 1796 until 1801. He was the last Governor-General of the Dutch East India Company, which was dissolved, bankrupt in 1799, but he remained in post as the Dutch state took over ruling its territories in the Indies. In that sense, he was also the first state appointed Governor-General of the Dutch East Indies.

Van Overstraten was appointed member-extraordinary of the Council of Justice (Raad van Justitie) in Batavia/Jakarta in 1780. He arrived in there in 1781. Subsequently, he was promoted to full member. In the same year, he was made interim Advocate-Fiscal. He was made Second Secretary to the High Government of the Indies in 1784. He was promoted in 1786 to First Secretary. He became Counsellor-extraordinary to the Dutch Council of the Indies in 1789. By 1791 he was Governor and Director of Java's Northeast Coast, in which post he greatly distinguished himself. During his time in the Northeast Coast, he was instrumental in getting Hamengkubuwono I established as the first Sultan of Yogyakarta. He wrote an historically important memoir for his successor containing information about that area during his term of office.

On 16 August 1796 Pieter van Overstraten was selected as Governor-General. On 17 February 1797, Willem Arnold Alting resigned as Governor-General and Commissioner of Police (Commissaris-General). He handed over his offices to Van Overstaten. The appointment was confirmed in the Netherlands on 22 January 1798. When the High Government of the Indies was dissolved in 1799, he resigned as Commissioner of Police, but remained as Governor-General serving the Batavian Republic, which the Netherlands had become under Napoleon Bonaparte. He remained in post until his death in Batavia in 1801.

During Van Overstraten's term of office, the Dutch East India Company (VOC) was dissolved, Ternate went into British hands, Batavia was blockaded by a British fleet, and the fortifications on the island of Onrust, and on a few other islands, destroyed.

== Sources ==
- Dutch East India Company (VOC) infosite (in Dutch)

Political offices
Preceded by Willem Arnold Alting	Governor-General of the Dutch East Indies; 1796–1801	Succeeded by Johannes Siberg
