= Herman Warner Muntinghe =

President of the Hooggerechtshof (Supreme Court) of the Dutch East Indies
- In office 1809–1816

President Council of Finance of the Dutch East Indies
- In office 1816–1819

Raad van Indië (Note: Member High Government of the Dutch East Indies)
- In office 1819–1827 Serving with Godert van der Capellen, Petrus Theodorus Chassé, Jacob Andries van Braam, Reinier d'Ozy
- Preceded by: New Creation
- Succeeded by: J. Bousquet

Personal details
- Born: Herman Warner Muntinghe; 24 April 1773 Amsterdam, Netherlands
- Died: 24 November 1827 (aged 54) Pekalongan, Dutch East Indies
- Spouse: Wilhelmina Adriana Mersen Senn van Basel (before 1827)
- Parents: Scato Muntinghe (father); Anna Elisabeth de Maffé (mother)
- Education: doctor juris
- Alma mater: University of Groningen
- Profession: attorney

Herman Warner Muntinghe (24 April 1773, Amsterdam - 24 November 1827, Pekalongan) was a Dutch chief justice of the Supreme Court of the Dutch East Indies and a colonial official who had great behind the scenes influence in the successive colonial governments of the Indies under governor-general Herman Daendels, lt-governor-general Sir Stamford Raffles, and the Commissioners-General of the Dutch East Indies. He was appointed a member of the first High Government of the Dutch East Indies in 1819.

== Life ==
=== Personal life ===
Muntinghe, was the son of Scato Muntinghe, a member of the Supreme Court of the province of Groningen in Groningen and Anna Elisabeth de Maffé. He partly received his education in England, attended the Latin school in Groningen from 1785 to 1787, became a student at the university there in 1787, and in 1796 was promoted to doctor of both Roman and Dutch law. He married Wilhelmina Adriana Mersen Senn van Basel.

=== Career ===
Appointed in 1801 as fiscal (Note: An official comparable to a procurator fiscal.) of the Council of Asiatic Possessions, (Note: The body that under the Batavian Republic succeeded the Heren XVII, or directors, of the VOC after its nationalization in 1799.) he submitted in 1802 a memorandum concerning the actions of Sebastiaan Cornelis Nederburgh and his fellow Commissioners. Appointed on 15 April 1804 to fiscal of the colony of Suriname, he did not accept this office, because Suriname had passed to the English, but left for the Dutch East Indies as a fiscal there. In 1807 Muntinghe became second secretary of the Indies Governor-General, Albertus Henricus Wiese; in 1808 Secretary of the new Governor-General Herman Daendels; in 1809 secretary-general and in the same year president of the Supreme Court of Justice in Batavia with the rank of extraordinary Councilor of the Indies.

After the conquest of Java by the English in 1811, Muntinghe initially objected to entering the British service, but decided to do so on 18 September 1811, when it had become apparent that the French regime (Note: After the Kingdom of Holland had been annexed to the First French Empire in 1810 the Dutch Indies had become the "French Indies", at least for a while.) had ceased to exist, and a British lieutenant-governor of Java en Dependencies (Stamford Raffles) had been appointed. During the English administration Muntinghe, who was now promoted to full member of the Council of the Indies, has been of great service to Raffles, which has also been frankly acknowledged by the latter. He took an active part in the reorganization of the judiciary.

In 1813 Muntinghe presented an important memorandum concerning the landrentesystem of taxation to be eventually introduced by the British regime. After the restoration of Dutch authority in August 1816, Muntinghe was retained as president of the Supreme Court of Justice, and became a member of the "Advisory Committee", installed by the Commissioners-General of the Dutch East Indies, (Note: Muntinghe would originally have been a member of this Commission-General himself, but was replaced at the last moment by Buyskes, probably because Muntinghe was at that moment still in British service, so could have a conflict of interest.) who had been sent out by the new Dutch king William I of the Netherlands to take over the government from the British on the basis of the Anglo-Dutch Treaty of 1814, which committee was called to inform the Government about various matters. Two months later he exchanged his judicial status for that of President of the newly established Council of Finance. When the question arose whether to return to the tax system of the old VOC, or to build on the foundations laid by the British administration, Muntinghe decidedly chose the latter line of action and made this clear in a very important report of 14 July 1817, with which the Council of Finance and also the Commissioners-General essentially agreed.

In 1816 Muntinghe was appointed as a Dutch member of a joint Commission for the settlement of differences of finance which had arisen with the former British administration. In 1818 and 1819 he was employed at Palembang (and Bangka Island) as Government Commissioner, in order to clear up the difficulties that had arisen with Sultan Mahmud Badaruddin II. He acted with force against both the native princes and the English, and made the British captain Salmond, who had been sent to Palembang by Raffles, then Governor of British Bencoolen, to counter the Dutch influence there, on his refusal to leave, with his retinue, to be deported to Batavia. However, he failed to subdue the Sultan, since only the military expedition of 1821 could put an end to his resistance.

After he had been appointed a member of the High Government of the Dutch Indies in 1819, Muntinghe went on leave to the Netherlands in late 1822 for health reasons. In 1824 he was appointed a member of the commission, which drafted the articles of incorporation of the Nederlandsche Handelsmaatschappij, of which Muntinghe was a great supporter. Returning to the Indies in 1825, he remained a member of the High Government for only a short timebefore resigning for reasons of health.

He died childless on 24 November 1827 in Pekalongan.

== Sources ==
- Blok, P.J.; Molhuysen, P.C., eds. (1912). "Muntinghe, mr. Herman Warner (by Rooseboom)". Nieuw Nederlandsch biografisch woordenboek (DNBL) (in Dutch). Sijthoff. pp. 966–967.
- Folkerts, J. De koloniale illusie. Herman Warner Muntinghe (1773-1827), architect van de koloniale staat. (Boom uitgevers, Amsterdam 2024) (doctoral dissertation Vrije Universiteit Amsterdam).
- Oranje, D.J.P. (1936). "Het beleid der Commissie Generaal; de uitwerking der beginselen van 1815 in het Regeerings Reglement van 1818 (dissertation)". bibliotheek.nl (in Dutch). Utrecht.
