= Willem Arnold Alting =

Governor-General of the Dutch East Indies (1724–1800)

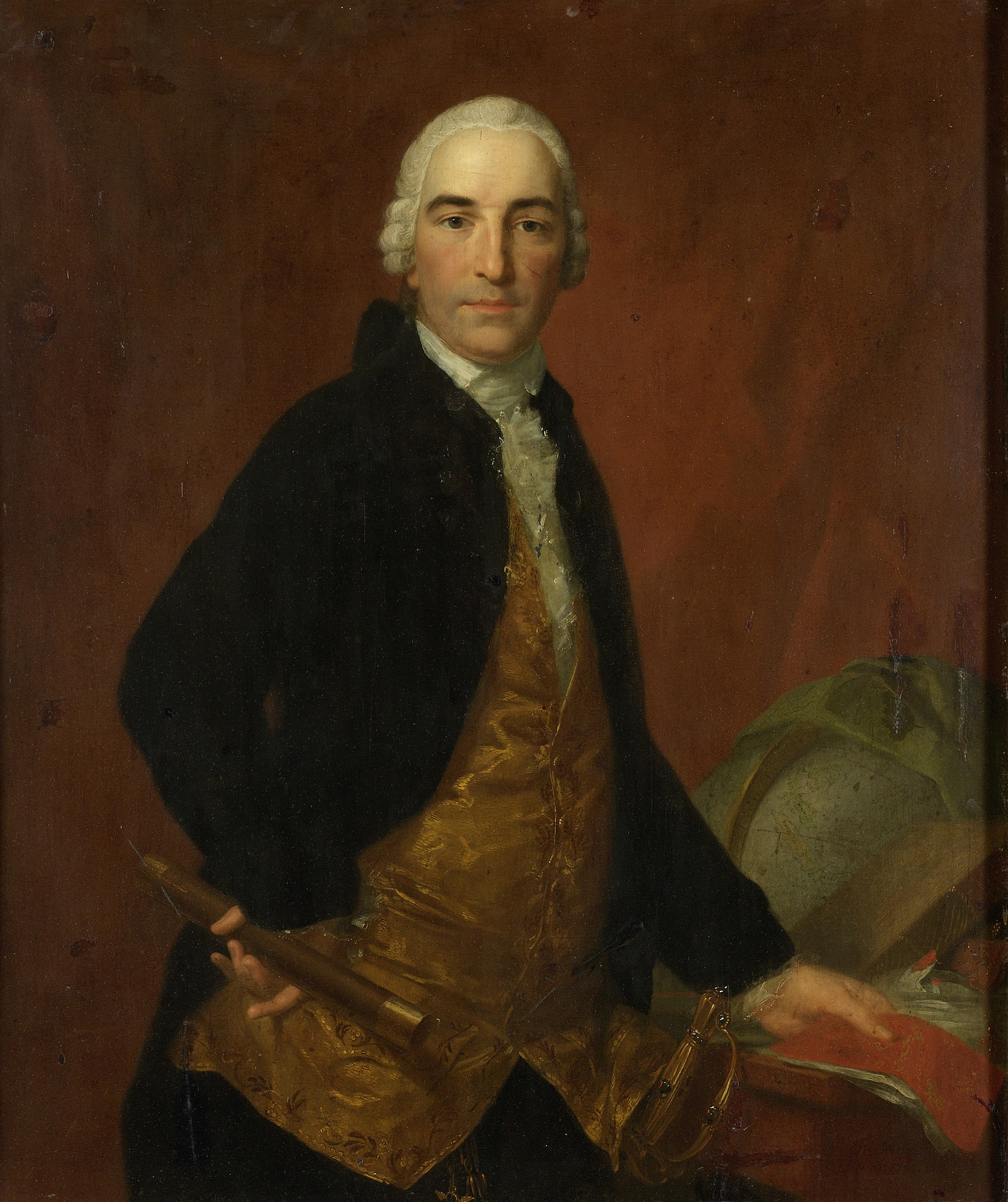
- Portrait by Friedrich Tischbein, 1788

Governor-General of the Dutch East Indies
- In office 1 September 1780 – 17 February 1797
- Preceded by: Reynier de Klerck
- Succeeded by: Pieter Gerardus van Overstraten

Personal details
- Born: 11 November 1724 Groningen, Dutch Republic
- Died: 7 June 1800 (aged 75) Batavia, Dutch East Indies (present‑day Indonesia)

Willem Arnold Alting (11 November 1724 – 7 June 1800) was a Dutch colonial administrator who served as Governor-General of the Dutch East Indies from 1780 to 1797.

Born in Groningen, Alting studied in his hometown and graduated in law. He left on 18 October 1750 for the East Indies on board the De Middelburg as an onderkoopman (underbuyer or undermerchant) for the Dutch East India Company (VOC). He spent the rest of his life in the Indies. In 1754 he became koopman (buyer or merchant) and in 1759 First Secretary to the government. In 1763 he became Counsellor-extraordinary (Buitengewoon Raad) and in 1772 full Counsellor (Raad ordinaris). In 1777, he became First Counsellor (Eerste Raad) was named Director-General.

From March 1780 he was acting Governor-General, because of the sickness of his predecessor, Reynier de Klerck. Following the death of De Klerck, on 1 September 1780, he was chosen by the Dutch Council of the Indies as provisional Governor-General. He carried on this function for seventeen years.

De Klerck had wanted to bring the use of Dutch into the educational system, but Alting revoked this in 1786, so that Malay and Portuguese were once again used. Alting's term of office was marked by a steep decline of the Dutch East India Company and its power in the Indies.

Three months after he took up post, the Netherlands went to war with Great Britain (in the 1780–1784 Fourth Anglo-Dutch War) and a great part of the territory of Dutch East India Company was occupied by the British. The government in Batavia (Jakarta) did not, on the whole, offer much resistance. Following the 1784 Peace of Paris, Britain obtained the right to unhindered trade in the East Indies. The Dutch had to cede Negapatam in India to the British. The image of the Dutch in the eyes of the local rulers was thoroughly shattered.

From the Netherlands, three Commissioners-General were sent to work with Alting to reorganise. On the way there, one of them died and Alting managed to get his son-in-law Johannes Siberg to take his place. The Alting-Siberg duo dominated the Commission and, from the reports of one of the other Commissioners, it seems they worked very hard in their own interests. The Commission cost a lot of money but brought no improvement. In 1795, it became known in Batavia that their homeland (in the meantime having become the Batavian Republic) was once again at war with Great Britain.

On 17 February 1797, Willem Arnold Alting resigned as Governor-General and Commissioner-General and handed the post over to Pieter Gerardus van Overstraten. Alting remained as an ordinary citizen, without official position, living on his estate at Kampong Melajoe near Batavia. He died there on 7 June 1800.
