= Johannes Siberg =

Governor-General of the Dutch East Indies

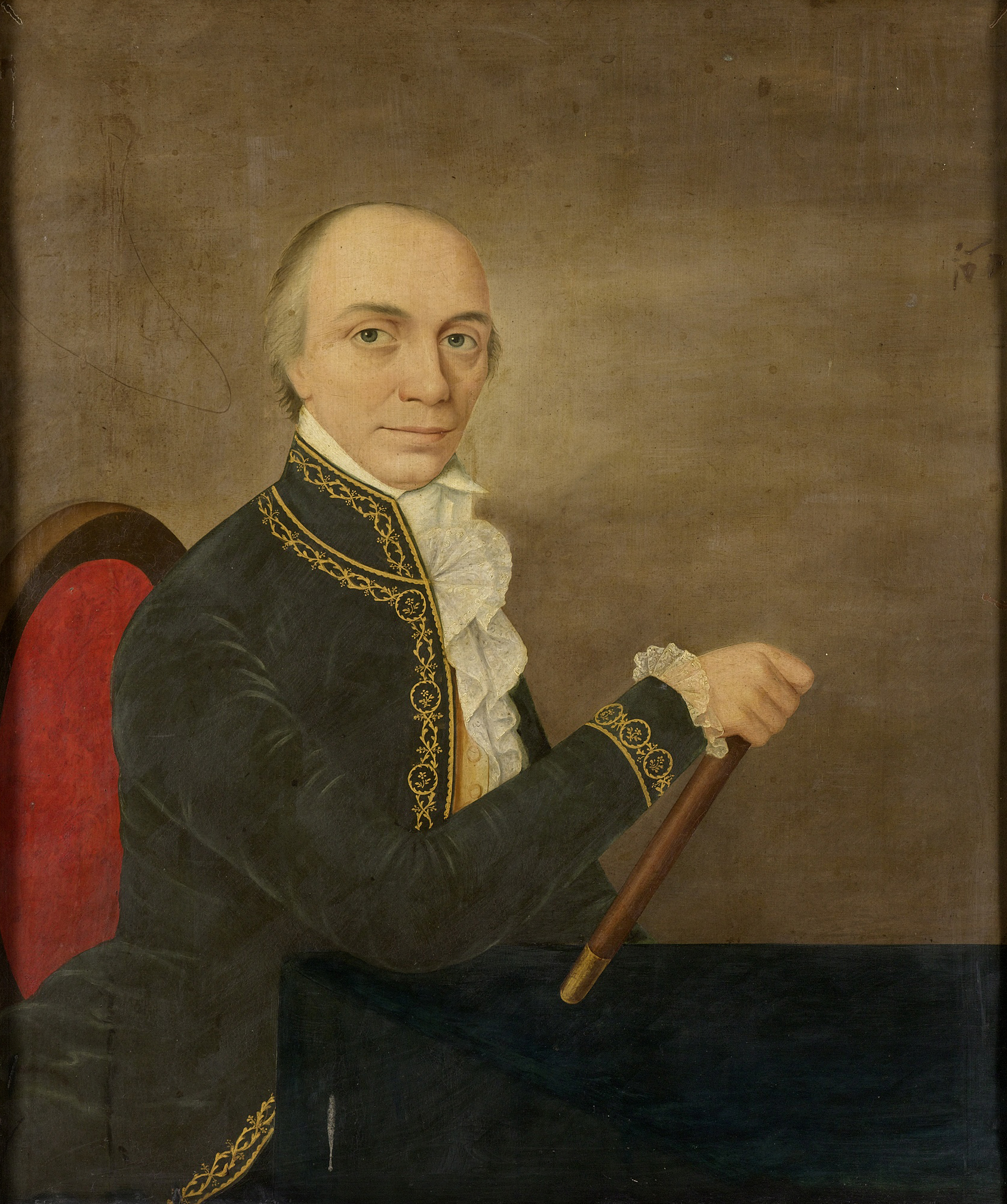
- Anonymous portrait, c. 1801–1805

Governor-General of the Dutch East Indies
- In office 22 August 1801 – 19 October 1804
- Appointed by: Batavian Republic
- Preceded by: Pieter Gerardus van Overstraten
- Succeeded by: Albertus Henricus Wiese

Personal details
- Born: 14 October 1740 Rotterdam, Dutch Republic
- Died: 18 June 1817 (aged 76) Batavia, Dutch East Indies (present‑day Indonesia)

Johannes Siberg (14 October 1740 – 18 June 1817) was Governor-General of the Dutch East Indies from 1801 to 1804, during which time control of the Dutch Indies passed from the Dutch East India Company (VOC) to the Napoleonic Dutch State in the guise of the Batavian Republic (later superseded by the Kingdom of Holland) which took over much of Dutch territory and broke their monopoly of trade. Local kings and princes took the opportunity of troubled times to try to reassert themselves. The various governments in the homeland tried various means to retrieve matters, including troop reinforcements and reforms, finally formally taking over the government functions of the VOC. Siberg resisted many of the reforms, and continued to do so after being removed from office.

== Early career ==
Johannes (or Joannes) Siberg born on 14 October 1740 in Rotterdam. When he was 18 years old, he left for the Indies as a contabelsmaat (assistant artillery master). He soon gave up the sea and climbed expertly through the Company's ranks – Underbuyer (onderkoopman) in 1770, Buyer (koopman) in 1771, to reach Senior Buyer (opperkoopman) in 1776. He married the daughter of Willem Arnold Alting (soon to be Governor-General) and shortly after that left for Panang to be the governor (gezaghebber) of Sumatra's West Coast. In 1780, he became Governor and Director of Java's Northwest Coast. He occupied this extremely lucrative post for seven years and became enormously wealthy. Meanwhile, in 1782 he became Counsellor-extraordinary (buitengewoon Raad) in the Dutch Council of the Indies.

After returning to Batavia, in 1787, he became President of the Schepenbank (the Bench of Aldermen, dealing with local administration), as well as a colonel in the local militia. In 1791, he was appointed full Counsellor of the Indies (Raad van Indië); in 1793 he was First Counsellor and Director-General (Eerste Raad en Directeur-Generaal). At the same time his father-in-law managed to get him appointed one of the three Commissarissen-Generaal (Commissioners General sent to re-organise the Dutch possessions in the face of British and French incursions, as well as restive native rulers). This duo managed to concentrate a lot of power in their hands, and those of their wider family attachments, especially after the new Batavian Republic merged the Commissie-generaal with the Raad van Indië (Council of the Indies). In 1800, the Batavian Republic took over formal control of the government of Nederlands-Indië (as it was now called) and vested authority in Council for the Asian Possessions, (Raad der Aziatische Bezittingen) whose combined assembly was packed with family members. They acted as a brake on much needed reforms, and lost ground to the British in particular.

== Governor-General of the Dutch East Indies ==
In 1801, following the death of his predecessor, Pieter Gerardus van Overstraten, he became acting Governor-General, and, one year later, was confirmed in the full, official function by the Batavian Republic. In 1802, the Peace of Amiens (ending the first phase of the Napoleonic Wars) also ended the Dutch trading monopoly, and they came under increasing British pressure. Following accusations of corruption and financial bungling, he was removed from office in 1804. In 1806, the Kingdom of Holland replaced the Batavian Republic. The new (Napoleonic) Kingdom established a Ministry of the Colonies to deal with Indian affairs. The new Governor-General Albertus Henricus Wiese was charged with making much needed reforms. Siberg, however, remained in the Indies, as leader of the Oudgastenpartij, a group of conservative landowners and merchants, still influencing (or interfering with, or frustrating, according to taste) his successors' attempts at reforms. He died in Batavia on 18 June 1817.

Political offices
Preceded by Pieter Gerardus van Overstraten	Governor-General of the Dutch East Indies; 1801–1805	Succeeded by Albertus Henricus Wiese
