= Pieter Hendrik van der Kemp =

Dutch historian (1845–1921)

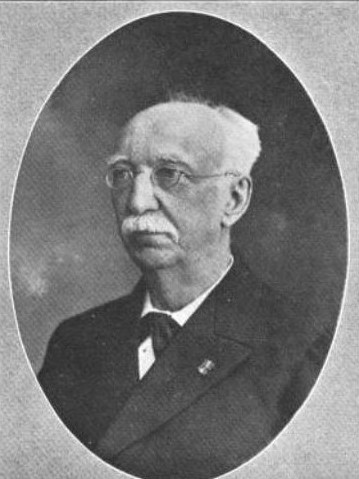
- P.H. van der Kemp
- Born: 24 May 1845; Naarden
- Died: 17 March 1921 and 75; The Hague
- Known for: Historian of Dutch East Indies

Pieter Hendrik van der Kemp (Naarden, 24 May 1845 – The Hague, 24 May 1921) was a Dutch colonial civil servant and a Dutch historian, specializing in the history of the Dutch East Indies.

== Life ==
=== Personal life ===
Van der Kemp was the son of Pieter Hendrik van der Kemp and Bernadina Julie Loise Dibbets. He first married Wilhelmina Cornelia de Vogel and later Bertha Knebel. They had the following children: Bertha Julia Louise van der Kemp (1869); Wilhelmine / Wilhelmina Cornelia Louise van der Kemp (1873); Catharina Barbara van der Kemp (1877); Petronella Hendrika de Graag (1879) and Christina van Der Kemp (1880).

=== Career ===
He was sent out to the Dutch East Indies where he first worked in the colonial civil service as a controleur. (Note: The same function Multatuli once fulfilled.) Later he became a teacher at the Gymnasium Willem III in Batavia. Still later he became first, Secretary, and later Director, of the Department of Education, Religious Affairs, and Industry in the government of the Dutch East Indies. After 26 years in the Dutch East Indies he returned to the Netherlands. There he devoted himself to his historical studies which resulted in many publications, mostly, but not exclusively, devoted to the history of the Indies, especially the period 1814 - 1824. He also was a founder of the Vereeniging "Moederland en Koloniën", which promoted the dissemination of knowledge about the colony among the general public. And he was elected as a member of the Municipal Council of The Hague.

Van der Kemp died in The Hague on 24 May 1921.

== Publications (Note: The following citations refer to works by Van der Kemp that are available on line at "Online Books by Pieter Hendrik van der Kemp". Online books library of the University of Pennsylvania.) ==
- Bijdragen tot de wordingsgeschiedenis van het reglement op de particuliere landerijen bewesten de Tiji-Manoek. (Batavia [Indonesia] Ogilvie & co., 1889)
- De administratie der geldmiddelen van Neerl.-Indië. (Amsterdam : J.H. de Bussy, 1881–1882)
- De commissiën van den Schout-bij-Nacht C.J. Wolterbeek naar Malakka en Riouw en Juli-December 1818 en Februari-April 1820. ([S.l., 189-?])
- De Singapoorsche papieroorlog. ([S.l., 189-?])
- Gedachtenisrede over Indië's teruggave in 1816. ('s-Gravenhage : M. van der Beek, 1916)
- Handboek tot de kennis van 's lands zoutmiddel in Nederlandsch-Indie : eene economisch-historische studie / (Batavia : G. Kolff, 1894)
- Het afbreken van onze betrekkingen met Bandjermasin onder Daendels en de herstelling van het Nederlandsch gezag aldaar op den in Januari 1817. ([n. p., 189-?])
- Het herstel van het Nederlandsch gezag in de Molukken in 1817; naar oorspronkelijke stukken. (['s-Gravenhage?, 191-?])
- Het Nederlansch-Indisch bestuur van 1817 op 1818 over de Molukken, Sumatra, Banka, Billiton en de Lampongs / ('s-Gravenhage : M. Nijhoff, 1917)
- Het reglement op de particuliere landerijen bewesten de Tjimanoek / (Batavia : Ogilvie, 1890)
- Het verblijf van Commissaris van den Broek op Bali van 18 December 1817 tot 24 Juni 1818. ([S.l., 189-?])
- Het weduwen- en weezenfonds van 'slands Europeesche ambtenaren in Nederlandsch-Indië : eene bijdrage tot de kennis der administratieve huishouding van staat. (Batavia : Landsdrukkerij, 1893)
- Java's landelijk stelsel, 1817-1819 ; naar oorspronkelijke stukken / (s̓-Gravenhage : Martinus Nijhoff, 1916)
- Mr. C. T. Elout als minister van Koloniën in zijne veroordeeling bvan het beleid der Regeering van den gouverneur-generaal baron Van der Capellen, blijkens onuitgegeven stukken / ([s. l. : s. n., 1909?])
- Oost-Indië's geldmiddelen, Japansche en Chineesche handel van 1817 op 1818/in en uitvoerrechten, opium, zout, tolpoorten, kleinzegel, boschwezen, Decima, Canton, naar oorspronkelijke stukken ('s Gravenhage, M. Nijhoff, 1919)
- Oost-Indië's herstel in 1816, naar oorspronkelijke stukken, ('s-Gravenhage, M. Nijhoff, 1911)
- Oost-Indië's inwendig bestuur van 1817 op 1818 ; Falck als minister, weduwenfondsen, onderwijs, wetenschap, kunst, kerk en zending, slavernij, verblijfrecht, handel, scheepvaart naar oorspronkelijke stukken / ('s-Gravenhage : Martinus Nijhoff, 1918)
- Over de bewaring van Hindoe-kunst op Java. (['s-Gravenhage, 1914])
- Raffles' Atjeh-overeenkomst van 1819. ([S.l., 189-?])
- Raffles' bezetting van de Lampongs in 1818. ([S.l., 189-?])
- Sumatra in 1818, naar oorspronkelijke stukken, ('s Gravenhage, M. Nijhoff, 1920)

For more works see "P.H. van der Kemp. Teksten van P.H. van der Kemp in tijdschriften en andere boeken". DBNL Digitale Bibliotheek voor de Nederlandse Letteren (in Dutch)..

== Sources ==
- Bosboom, Herman Dirk Hendrik (1921). "In memoriam P. H. van der Kemp, 1845-1921". Nederlandsch Indië oud & nieuw (in Dutch). 6 (1): 8–10.
