= British expedition to Palembang =

1812 military expedition

Coordinates: 2.9923°S 104.7597°E

Date	17 – 28 April 1812
Location	Palembang
Result	British victory; Mahmud Badaruddin II deposed; Palembang cedes Bangka–Belitung

Belligerents
Palembang Sultanate	United Kingdom

Commanders and leaders
Mahmud Badaruddin II	Robert Gillespie; James Bowen

Strength
Unknown, over 340 guns	2 frigates, 5 sloops 1,000 troops

Casualties and losses
>300 guns captured	Little to none

The British expedition to Palembang took place in April 1812, led by Colonel Robert Rollo Gillespie against Sultan Mahmud Badaruddin II. The expedition aimed to force the sultanate to cede the island of Bangka to the colonial government, while citing a massacre of the Dutch garrison in Palembang in 1811 as justification.

Upon the approach of the expedition forces, Palembang's defenses with their guns were captured by British forces without fighting. With a split between his brother who refused to fight, Badaruddin fled Palembang and the British occupied the city by 28 April, installing Badaruddin's brother as Sultan Ahmad Najamuddin II. Najamuddin agreed to cede Bangka, along with Belitung, to the British. The British abandoned Bangka quickly due to diseases, and Badaruddin returned to the throne by 1818 under restored Dutch rule for some time.

== Background ==
As British administrator Stamford Raffles came to the Dutch East Indies in 1810, he had proposed to the East India Company that the Sultanate of Palembang should be permanently taken by the British from Dutch influence. To this end, he had begun correspondence with Palembang's Sultan Mahmud Badaruddin II before the 1811 invasion of Java, with plans to supply the Sultanate with weapons in exchange for assistance in the upcoming invasion. He proposed a treaty of alliance between the British and Palembang, in which Palembang would expel Dutch officials and residents. (Note: In Malay, the proposed treaty was worded in a way which could be interpreted as "getting rid of the Dutch violently".) Arms were sent to Palembang, but arrived too late for the Palembangers to be able to join the invasion of Java which landed on 11 September 1811. Instead, the arms were used to attack a Dutch garrison at the mouth of the Musi River on 14 September, which was massacred after the garrison fell.

Reports of the Dutch massacre were received by the British government in December 1811, after they seized Java. By that point, Badaruddin had proven to be difficult for the British in terms of negotiations, and the British was eyeing the tin-rich island of Bangka which was under Palembang. Raffles cited the massacre of the Dutch garrison (Note: The Dutch were at war with the British then, and in a reply to Raffles, Governor-General of India Lord Minto was more concerned with the destruction of the Dutch fort (seen as British property after the conquest) than the loss of life.) as justification for military action, but in private correspondence made clear that seizing Bangka was a major goal.

== Expedition ==
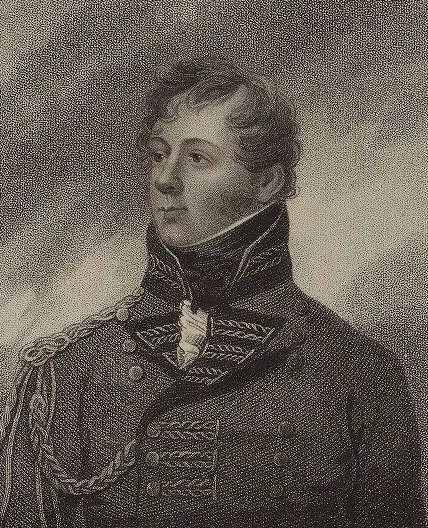
Robert Rollo Gillespie, commander of the British troops in the expedition.

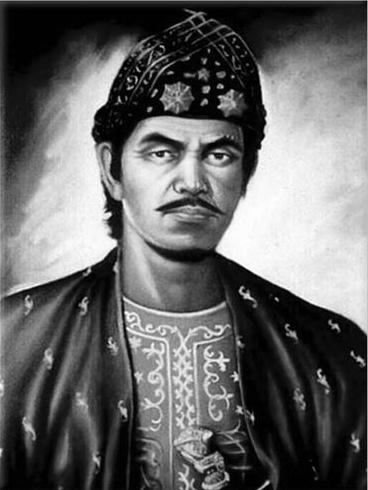
Mahmud Badaruddin II, Sultan of Palembang in 1812.

The British naval contingent consisted of Royal Navy frigates Phoenix and Cornelia and sloop-of-war Procris, accompanied by East India Company gunboats Teignmouth, Mercury, Wellington, and Young Barracouta. Four transport carried the troops, which included five companies of the 89th Regiment and three companies of the 59th Regiment, along with detachments from various Sepoy units and some Ambonese soldiers. The soldiers were commanded by Colonel Robert Rollo Gillespie, while Captain James Bowen was senior officer of the naval contingent. The force departed Batavia on 20 March 1812, arriving at Bangka on 3 April, and the troops disembarked from their transports to enter the Musi River using small boats on 17 April. Gillespie was given instructions that, should deposition of Badaruddin be deemed too difficult, the expedition was to demand an indemnity.

Due to strong currents and winds, the British force struggled to enter the Musi River, and received several envoys in the ensuing days from Badaruddin. Gillespie rejected requests to enter Palembang alone, and the British squadron steadily proceeded upriver. Throughout their trip, the British encountered several armed proa, but there were no engagements and the proa would flee when the British sent rowboats after them. On 22 April, the British flotilla reached a Palembang gun battery and several ships and proa forming a blockade along the river. No fire was exchanged, however. When the British demanded a surrender from the battery's garrison, they found the ships and batteries abandoned the following morning, and they captured 102 guns. That evening, a group of fire rafts approached the British fleet, which towed them away without damage.

At Palembang, a dispute went on regarding how to deal with the British expedition. While Badaruddin intended to fight, his brother wanted to avoid fighting and proposed that Badaruddin flee Palembang. The two had been involved in a succession dispute since the death of their father – while Badaruddin was the crown prince, his brother was the favorite son. As the British continued to approach, Badaruddin II finally chose to flee the city with his treasury, armory, and retainers, and chaos ensued in Palembang as remaining soldiers in the city began to engage in looting. Gillespie with a small group of guards went ahead of the fleet on a rowboat to Palembang, arriving on the evening of 25 April. Palembang's keraton, with 242 guns, fell to the British without resistance, and the Union Jack was raised in Palembang on 28 April.

== Aftermath ==
The British installed Mahmud Badaruddin II's brother as Sultan Ahmad Najamuddin II. Najamuddin agreed to cede Bangka and neighboring Belitung to the British, who renamed Bangka as the Duke of York island and the town of Muntok as Minto (after Lord Minto). The British stationed a garrison in Bangka, which experienced a high mortality rate and the British abandoned it before the return of Dutch rule in 1816. Badaruddin waged a guerilla war against the British, establishing a stronghold at the Rawas River and repelling a force of 150 soldiers sent to apprehend him in July 1812.

Badaruddin briefly returned to the throne after an agreement with the British resident in Palembang involving an indemnity payment, but when the main government in Batavia learned of it, they annulled the agreement, reinstalled Najamuddin, and refunded Badaruddin's indemnity. He also received a government amnesty and a stipend. The Dutch deposed Najamuddin in 1818 and reinstalled Badaruddin, before the Dutch sent two expeditions against Badaruddin in 1819 and 1821 and exiled him to Ternate after his defeat.
