= Palembang pitis =

Currency of the Palembang Sultanate

ڤيتس ڤلمبڠ
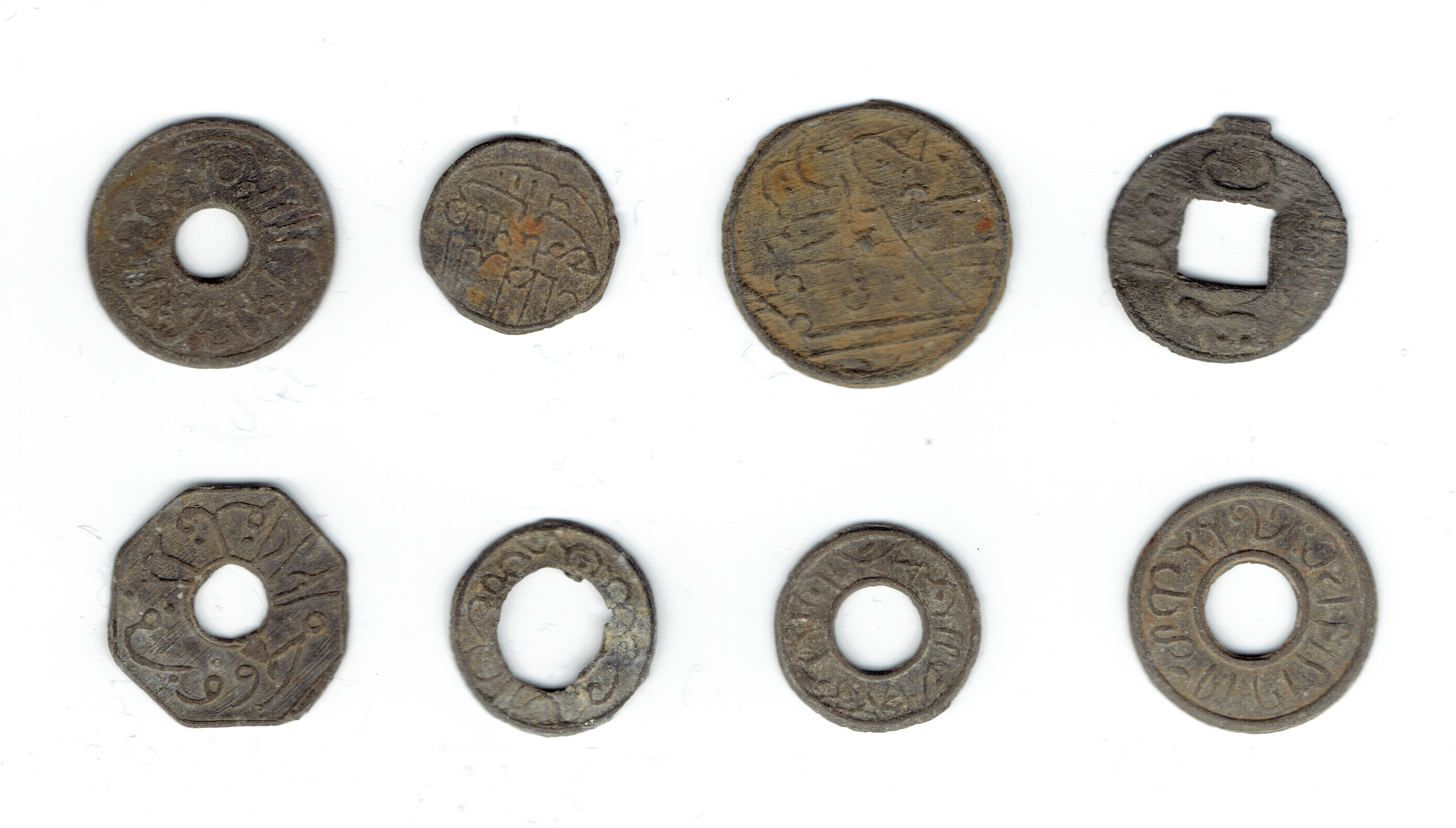
- Some coins of Palembang pitis

Denominations
- Superunit
- 250: kupat
- 500: cucuk

Demographics
- Date of introduction: 1600s
- Date of withdrawal: 1825
- User(s): Palembang Sultanate

The Palembang pitis (also spelled pitjis) was a currency issued by the Palembang Sultanate from the 1600s until 1825 when the sultanate was dissolved and its territory taken over by the colonial government of the Dutch East Indies. The currency consisted of low denomination tin alloy coins which were mostly traded in bulk. Due to the lack of a centralized mint, the pitis often had inconsistent manufacture and were frequently counterfeited.

== History ==
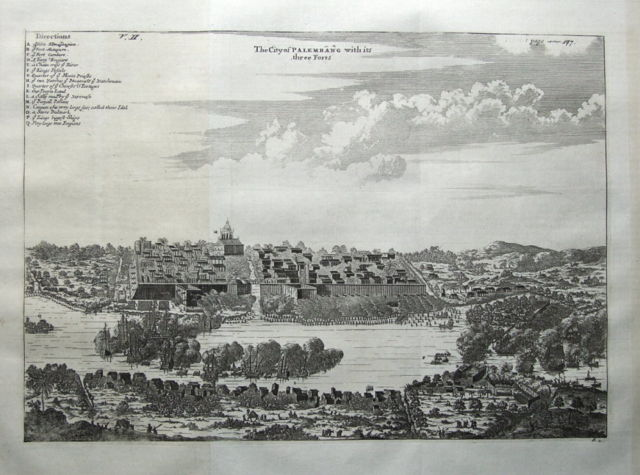
Walled city of Palembang circa 1659.

Palembang, like Banten, had become an independent sultanate when the Demak Sultanate declined following the death of Sultan Trenggana in 1546. Thereafter from the 1560s to 1620s, Palembang became an active trade participant in two key products of the region, pepper and tin. During the course of this trade, coins from various local sultanates circulated in Palembang, namely Banten, Siak, Kampar and Jambi, in addition to Chinese cash coins which had already been circulating in the archipelago. Palembang's earliest coinage date from this period, which were tin imitation of Chinese cash with Chinese characters phonetically rendering "pangeran" or "sultan" into panglân (邦闌) (Note: Mitchiner (2012:35-36) identified the characters for "pangeran" as 邦㒷 and annotate them as pang lan. However, this seems to be a mistranscription, as the character 㒷 (a simplified variant of 興) is not known to have pronunciation similar to lan in any varieties of Chinese.) and sútan (史丹) respectively, dated between 1600 and 1658. This was followed by an issue with Jawi inscription reading 'alamat sulṭan (علامت سلطان), dated between 1658 and 1710. The second half of the 17th century saw increasing monopoly of the Dutch East Indies Company (VOC) in the pepper and tin trade. This severely undermined the regional trading network and undermined the prosperity of local sultanates. Local coins became scarce in Palembang, with the exception of coins minted at Palembang itself. Beside the pitis, the early 18th century also saw the release of the VOC duiten and Spanish dollar, which also circulated in Palembang.

Around 1710, tin deposits were discovered on Bangka Island, which was part of Palembang Sultanate at the time. The discovery led to a tin surplus which was traded in form of ingots by the sultanate and provided materials for low denomination coinage in mass quantity. The 18th century coinage of the Palembang Sultanate consisted of two separate coin series. The first is the sultan's small-size coins bearing Jawi inscriptions, and the second are larger-size coins bearing Chinese inscription. The Chinese-style coins, which were minted for the Chinese mining communities on Bangka are commonly thought to only circulate in Bangka. However, Bangka at the time had close ties with the administration of Palembang town and Chinese-style coins appeared to have also been minted in the city as well. It is very likely that the Chinese-style coins circulated side by side with the sultan's coins within the core areas of Palembang.

In 1812, Palembang lost its source of tin when British forces occupied Bangka Island. The island went on to become a nominal Dutch possession after the Anglo-Dutch Treaty of 1814 and was formally handed over to the Dutch in 1816. Around the 1820s, Sultan Mahmud Badaruddin II rose up against the Dutch but was defeated by the Dutch general Hendrik Merkus de Kock in 1821. The Dutch divested Mahmud of his powers and exiled him to Ternate in the same year. In 1825, the Dutch took Palembang under direct Dutch administration. The last dated Palembang pitis was from 1804, and presumably further production ceased by 1825.

== Manufacture ==
Palembang's output of coins had been fairly restrained before 1710, but tin surplus expanded the state's coinage. Pitis were cast in the same way as Chinese cash coins: molten tin was first cast into molds which resulted in "coin trees." Individual coins were then broken off and polished to round the edges, although stem remnants from unthorough polishing are commonly seen in Palembang pitis. Finally, a die is used to struck the coin with the appropriate inscription.

Official coinage issued by the Sultan formed only one part of the total coinage circulating in Palembang, as the manufacture of counterfeit coinage became a major industry. Counterfeit coins could have been made by almost anyone with access to Palembang's tin supply during the period of tin surplus. There are reports of severe punishment against counterfeiters, but as the quality of official pitis themselves were often inconsistent due to lack of centralized manufacture, it may be difficult to ascertain whether a particular sample is official or unauthorized issue. Common inconsistencies include size, weight, and inscriptions (which were especially prone of deformation in early types).

== Types ==
All currency of Palembang pitis consisted of coins made from tin-lead alloy, except for a single copper issue. Each type contain inscription on the obverse with blank reverse. Most contain the Arabic phrase في بلد ڤلمبڠ fi bilad Palembang ("in the land of Palembang") rendered in Jawi script, and some included year of mintage using Hijri era or Anno Hegirae (AH). Coins could be divided into two categories: coins without a hole called pitis buntu and coins with a hole called pitis teboh, which included Chinese cash imitations. Disregarding variants, some of the known types produced by the official Palembang mint are as following:

=== Pitis Buntu ===
Inscription		Year of mintage		Image	Reigning Sultan
Jawi	Romanization	AH	CE	Image	Reigning Sultan
ڤلمبڠ ?	? Palembang (Note: The stylized lettering of this coin is difficult to read. The few writers who have reviewed this coin only agreed on the "Palembang" part.)	–	(circa 1750 (Note: According to Robinson (2015).) or 1812–1816 (Note: According to Mitchiner & Yih (2013:43)))		Mahmud Badaruddin I Jayo Wikramo (1724–1757), or; Mahmud Badaruddin II (1804–1813, 1818–1821)
ال سلطان في بلد ڤلمبڠ ؁١١٩٣	al-Sulṭan fi bilad Palembang sanat 1193	1193	1779/80		Muhammad Bahauddin (1776–1803)

=== Pitis Teboh ===
Inscription		Year of mintage		Image	Reigning Sultan
Jawi	Romanization	AH	CE	Image	Reigning Sultan
邦闌㒷宝	bānglán xīngbǎo (Mandarin) (Note: Mitchiner (2012:35) noted that some source attributed this coin to Cirebon, such as Millies (1871:53-54, Plate XV), but recent evidence suggests Palembang as the more likely issuer.) panglân hengpó (Hokkien)	–	(circa 1600–1658)		Pangeran Madi Angsoko (1595–1629), up to; Sri Susuhunan Abdurrahman (1659-1706)
史丹利寶	shǐdān lìbǎo (Mandarin) (Note: Idem) sútan līpó (Hokkien)	–	(circa 1600–1658)		Pangeran Madi Angsoko (1595–1629), up to; Sri Susuhunan Abdurrahman (1659-1706)
علامت سلطان	'alamat Sulṭan (Note: Mitchiner (2012:36) noted that some source attributed this coin to Jambi, such as Millies (1871:109), but recent evidence suggests Palembang as the more likely issuer.)	–	(circa 1658–1710)		Sri Susuhunan Abdurrahman(1659–1706), up to; Muhammad Mansyur Jayo Ing Lago (1706–1718)
ضرب في بلد ڤلمبڠ دار السلام	ḍarb fi bilad Palembang dar al-salam	–	(circa 1710–1778)		Muhammad Mansyur Jayo Ing Lago (1706–1718), up to; Muhammad Bahauddin (1776–1803)
علامت في بلد ڤلمبڠ دار السلام ؁١١٦٢	'alamat fi bilad Palembang dar al-salam sanat 1162	1162	1749/50		Mahmud Badaruddin I Jayo Wikramo (1724–1757)
هذا فلوس في بلد ڤلمبڠ ؁١١٩٨	hadha fulus fi bilad Palembang sanat 1198 (Note: This is the only known type to have a copper issue.)	1198	1783/84		Muhammad Bahauddin (1776–1803)
ال سلطان في بلد ڤلمبڠ ؁	al-Sulṭan fi bilad Palembang sanat (date)	1200–1204	1785–1789/90		Muhammad Bahauddin (1776–1803)
مصروف في بلد ڤلمبڠ ١٢١٩	maṣruf fi bilad Palembang 1219	1219	1804/5		Mahmud Badaruddin II (1804–1813, 1818–1821)

== Exchange rate ==
Palembang pitis served as low denomination currency valued and exchanged in bulks with the VOC duiten and Spanish dollar. Buntu and teboh were worth the same and they only differed in their group units. Pitis buntu were grouped into parcels wrapped in leaves. A parcel with 250 pieces is known as a kupat (كوفات) which has the value of one kejer equivalent to 20 duiten and 1/16 dollar. Pitis teboh were grouped into strings with a piece of rattan or twine, similar to Chinese cash. A string with 500 pieces is known as cucuk (چوچق) which has the value of one tali equivalent to two kejer. Known units of value and their exchange rate are shown below.

Palembang pitis				VOC duiten	Spanish dollar
Unit		Equivalence	# pieces	VOC duiten	Spanish dollar
ريال	real	2 jampel	4000	320	1
جمفل	jampel	2 suku	2000	160	1/2
سوكو	suku	2 tali	1000	80	1/4
تالي	tali	2 kejer	500	40	1/8
كجر	kejer	(1 kupat or 1/2 cucuk)	250	20	1/16
-	-	(1/2 kupat or 1/4 cucuk)	125	10	1/32

== See also ==
- Early Nusantara coins
- Cash coins in Indonesia
- Brunei pitis
