= Kuto Besak =

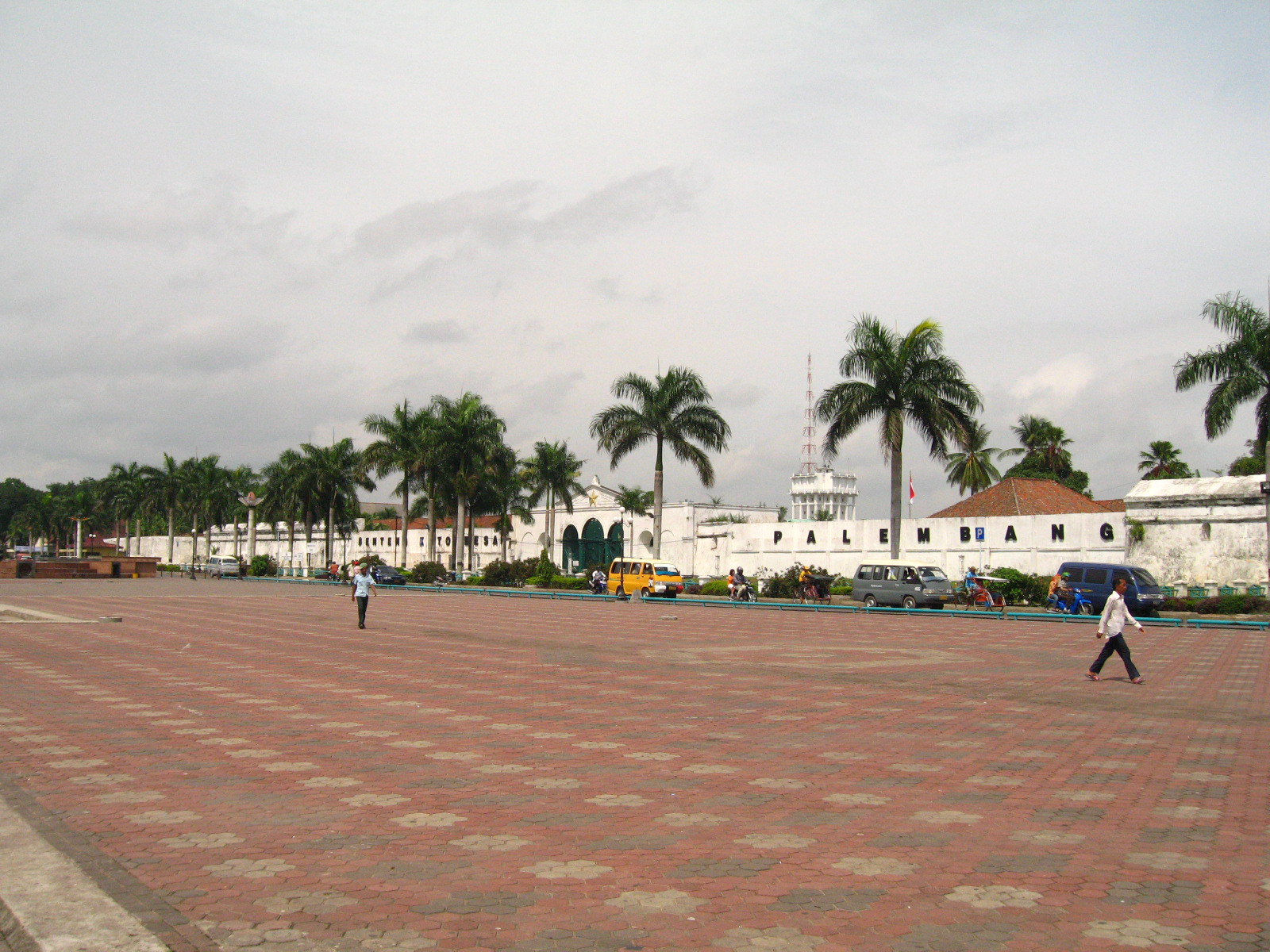
- The fort of Kuto Besak
- Interactive map of the Kuto Besak area

General information
- Architectural style: Fortress, Palace
- Location: Palembang, Indonesia
- Coordinates: 2.9914°S 104.7592°E
- Construction started: 1780
- Completed: February 21, 1797
- Client: Palembang Sultanate

Kuto Besak (Palembang for "Great Fortress"), also known tautologically in Indonesian as Benteng Kuto Besak, is an 18th-century kraton (Indonesian fortified palace) in Palembang, South Sumatra. Kuto Besak was the center of the Sultanate of Palembang before its abolition by the Dutch colonial government. The fort was constructed in 1780 and took seventeen years to complete. Kuto Besak was inaugurated in 1797, marked by the transfer of the royal residence from the older Kuto Lamo to Kuto Besak.

== History ==
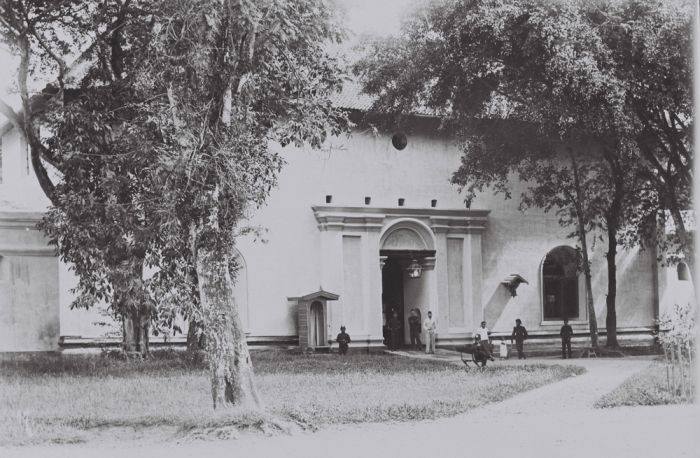
Kuto Besak in early 20th-century.

Before Kuto Besak, the center of the Sultanate of Palembang was located at Kraton Kuto Gawang, located at what is now the headquarters of the Pupuk Sriwidjaja, a state-owned fertilizer company. In 1651, the kraton was attacked by the Dutch East India Company who wanted to monopolize the trade in Palembang. The attack devastated the fortified palace of Kuto Gawang and as a result, the royal palace was transferred to a new place at Kraton Beringin Janggut (now the site is located at Pasar 16 Ilir). During the reign of Sultan Mahmud Badaruddin I (1724–1758), the kraton was moved again to Kraton Kuto Lama.

Sultan Mahmud Badaruddin I had a plan to build the fourth kraton. The construction of the fort only started decades later in 1780, during the reign of Muhammad Bahauddin (1776–1803). The construction was supervised by the Chinese using native and Chinese laborers. Construction took seventeen years and in 1797 the new fort was completed. Sultan Mahmud Bahauddin officially inaugurated the new fort on February 21, 1797. At the same time, the royal family and the government administration of the Sultanate moved to the new fort. At its completion, the fort was one of the four kratons of the Palembang Sultanate; the other kratons were Kraton Kuto Gawang, Kraton Beringin Janggut, and Kraton Kuto Batu/Kuto Lama, which together acted as administrative centers of the Sultanate.

On June 25, 1821, the Palembang Sultanate fell to the Dutch colonial government. The kraton Kuto Besak was officially taken over by the Dutch colonial government on July 1, 1821. Before the kraton was taken over by force, the Sultan ordered the destruction of all the valuables inside the kraton. When the Dutch entered the kraton, they discovered only books, several coins and gold, and 74 cannons. On July 13, 1821, Sultan Mahmud Badaruddin II and his relatives were exiled from the kraton to the island of Ternate, Maluku. Mahmud Badaruddin stayed in Ternate until his death on September 26, 1852. The kraton was then re-purposed as the residence for Resident R. Keer and mess halls for 400 Dutch soldiers.

Today Kuto Besak is used as the headquarters of the defense command Kodam II/Sriwijaya, a legacy from the colonial era which the Indonesian government did not manage to change. With very little maintenance, the inner buildings of the 18th-century fort degraded slowly, despite its former might and importance. The fort is still closed to the public.

== Fort building ==
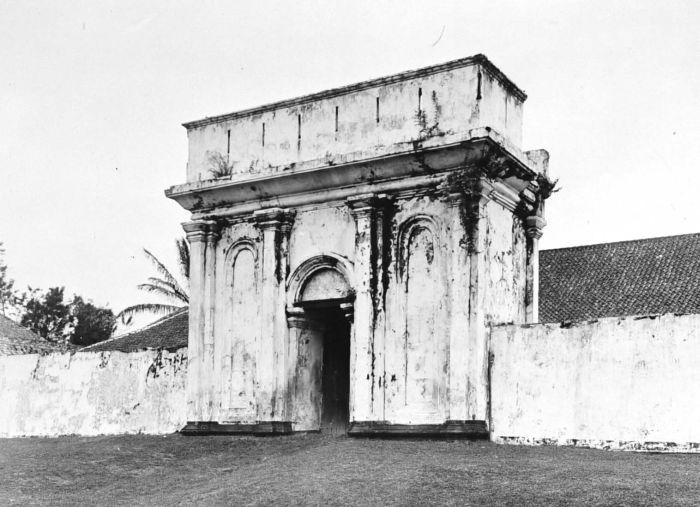
The eastern gate of Kuto Besak in the 1930s, the gate still exists.

Kraton Kuto Besak was strategically located overlooking the River Musi as part of the defensive strategy of the Sultanate at that time. It was surrounded by a roughly 30 feet (9.1 m) high white-washed brick wall. Bricks are mainly used for the construction of the wall. The bonding adhesive used for the bricks is a mixture of egg white and limestone taken from the upstream region of Ogan River. The brick wall surrounds the kraton, which is rectangular in shape of 288.75 metres (947.3 ft) long and 183.75 metres (602.9 ft) wide. The wall is equipped with bastions, three bastions at the east, south, and west are trapezoid-shaped, while the one on the northwest is shaped like a pentagon. The main gate of the fort is known as lawang kuto, located facing the Musi River. The other two gates, the lawang borotan is located in the west side and the east side of the fort.

When the kraton was completed in late 18th-century, the kraton was surrounded by Palembang's many crisscrossing streams: the Sekanak to the west, the Tengkuruk to the east, and the Kapuran to the north. The Tengkuruk stream was buried and converted into a street in 1928. The street is now Jalan Lintas Timur Sumatera, the street that leads to the Ampera Bridge. Inside the kraton were buildings used by the Palembang Sultanate's royal family. The palace proper, known as the dalem, stood inside a square and had a yard where two small sawo trees grew. The dalem was divided into two parts. One was the sultan's private quarters separated from other parts by a wall. The other parts of the dalem was a building for the noble women. The kraton also had a pond with small boats, surrounded with garden of fruit trees, a typical feature in the kraton of Indonesia.

Many buildings are established outside the wall of the Kraton Kuto Besak e.g. Pemarekan Building (building used to welcome guests of honor) and Pendopo Pemarekan, both are located to the east of the main gate Lawang Kuto.

== Transport ==
Kuto Besak can be accessed by Palembang LRT (via nearby Ampera LRT station) as well as Trans Musi bus.

== See also ==
- Palembang Sultanate
