= Pitis =

The pitis was a tin coin issued by several South-East Asian states. It may refer to:

- Brunei pitis
- Cash coins in Indonesia
- Palembang pitis
- Kelantan keping
- Trengganu keping
- Pitis (Madrid Metro), a station on Line 7
