= Tin mining in Indonesia =

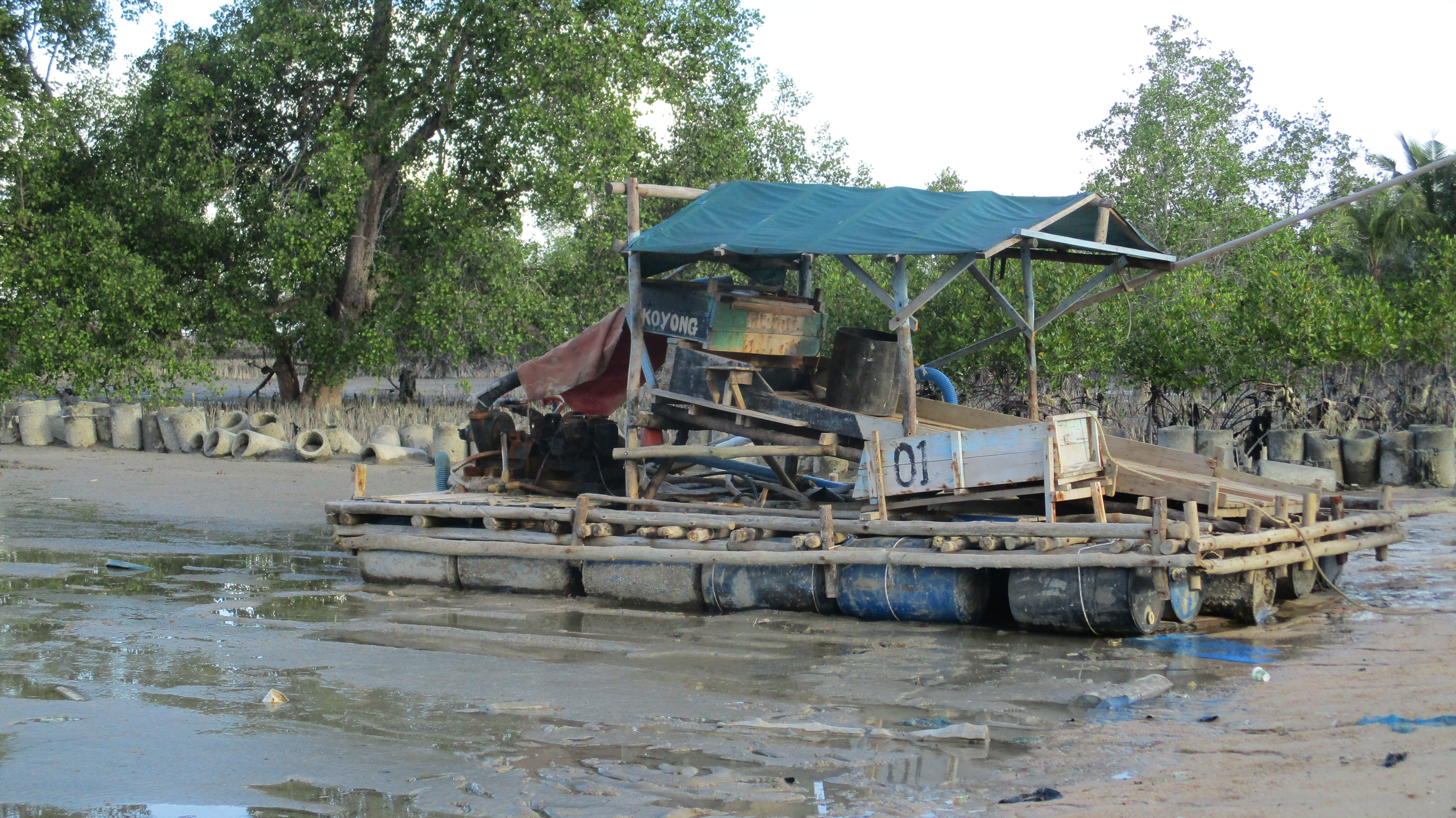
A pontoon in Bangka engaging in artisanal tin mining.

Indonesia is the world's second-largest producer of tin and its largest exporter. Tin mining activities in Indonesia are concentrated in the Bangka Belitung Islands province with some production in nearby areas. Exports of tin from the region predated European colonization, with the Dutch East India Company commencing commercial exploitation of the resource in the 18th century. Large mining concerns controlled tin production throughout the 19th and much of the 20th century under both the Dutch and Indonesian governments.

Following the restructuring of the state-owned mining company PT Timah and the fall of President Suharto in the 1990s, small-scale artisanal tin mining had become the dominant producer in the country. The wide extent of mining activities on Bangka and Belitung has had significant environmental impact, with a large number of unreclaimed mining pits or kolong covering the islands' landscape. Smuggling and child labor have become issues in the industry. Poor safety measures have also resulted in hundreds of miners being killed in accidents.

== History ==
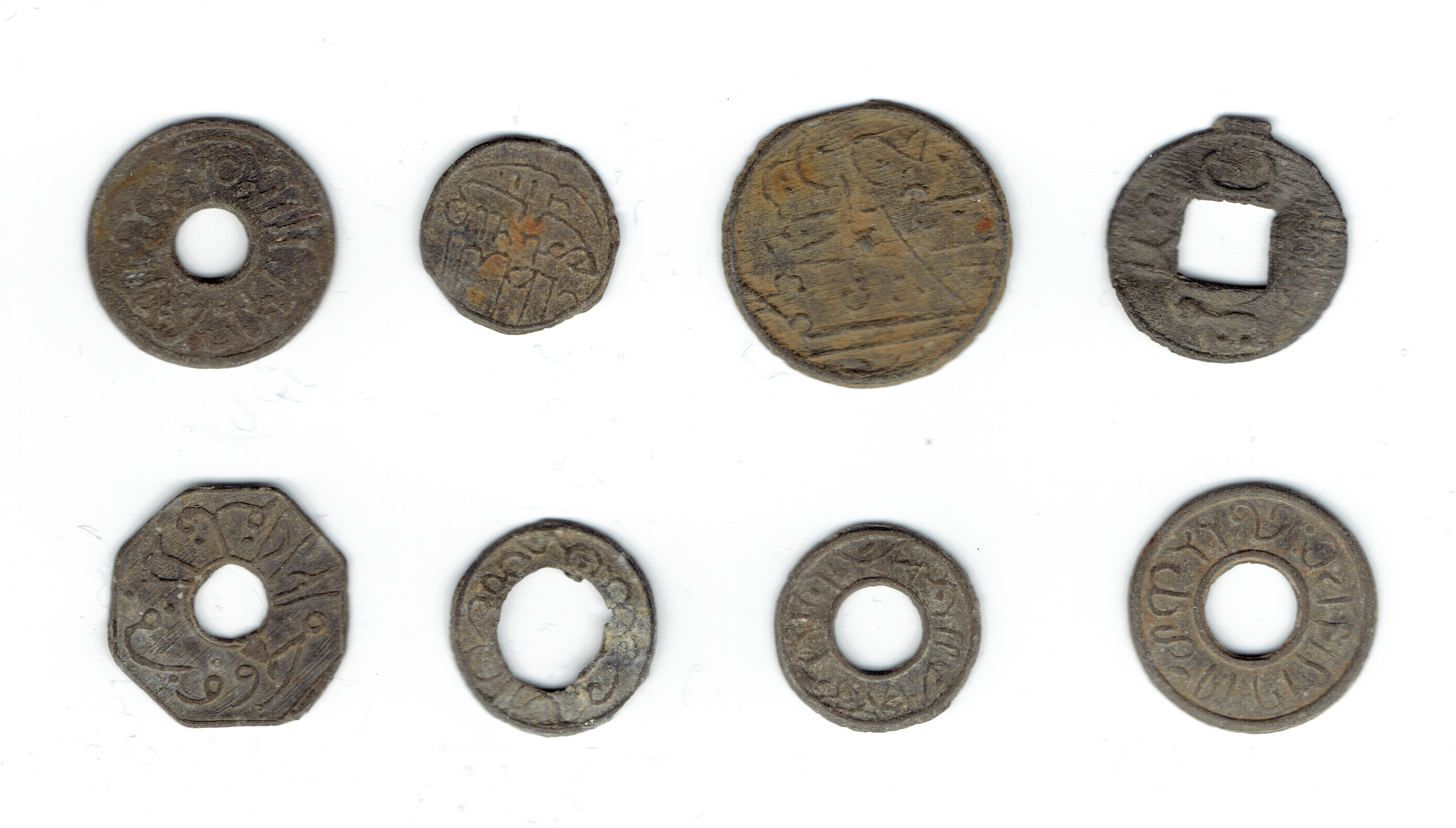
Palembang Sultanate's pitis coins were cast from Bangka's tin output.

Small-scale mining of tin in modern Indonesia might have begun in Bangka by the 7th century; some exports of tin from Bangka are dated to the 13th century. After the arrival of the Dutch in the region, the Dutch East India Company (VOC) signed a treaty with the Palembang Sultanate which granted the VOC monopoly rights over Bangka's tin trade in 1722. Tin mining was further developed in Bangka in the 18th century, with migrant workers from China working the mines. Large tin deposits were further discovered in 1823 at the neighboring island of Belitung, and Billiton Maatschappij (today part of BHP) was founded to exploit Belitung's tin, obtaining a concession over the island's mineral rights in 1860. Billiton continued operations for some time after Indonesian independence, until Dutch mining operations in Indonesia were seized in 1958.

The Indonesian state-owned PT Timah company was established in 1976 to exploit the deposits in Bangka and Belitung. Due to declines in global tin prices, the company underwent large-scale restructurization in 1990, laying off 26,000 employees. Following the fall of Suharto in 1998, deregulation of mining activities resulted in a boom of small-scale mining activities, with a large proportion being illegal. It was estimated in 2019 that small-scale miners made up 60% of Indonesian tin production and covered 50,000 workers. PT Timah alone employed or outsourced around 10,000 workers in 2023.

Another major tin mining center was Singkep, near Bangka and Belitung but part of Riau Islands. Legal mining operations on the island ceased in 1991 following Timah's restructurization, although illegal mining activities continued on the island with some arrests in 2023.

== Statistics ==
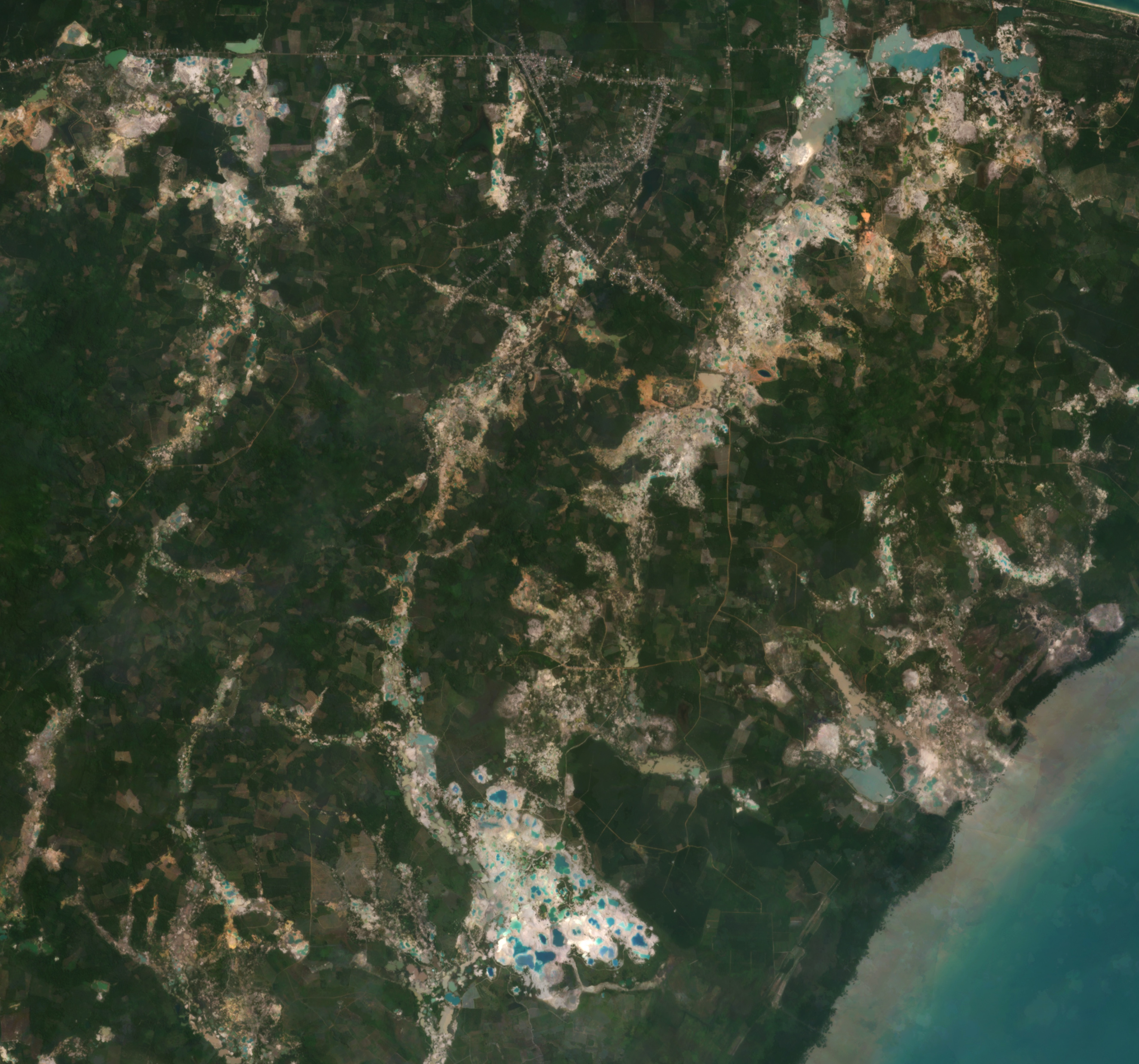
Satellite image of tin mining pits in Bangka.

The Indonesian Ministry of Energy and Mineral Resources reported in 2020 that Indonesia was the world's second-largest producer of tin behind China, with an annual production of 78,000 tonnes and a proven deposit of 800,000 tonnes. The country was also the largest tin exporter globally, with Indonesian exports making up 32 percent of the international trade in 2020, worth US$1.11 billion. Domestic consumption of tin amounted to just 13 percent of national output in 2021, leading to calls to further downstreaming of the industry.

Around 90 percent of national production originated from Bangka and Belitung, with smaller amounts being mined in Riau, Riau Islands, and West Kalimantan, and 95 percent of legal output in 2019 was produced by PT Timah which controlled over half a million hectares in mining concessions. Tin smuggling is a significant issue, with the Indonesia Corruption Watch estimating that around one-fifth of Indonesian exports between 2004 and 2013 were smuggled.

In 2023, tin mining concessions covered over 1 million hectares – approximately one-eighth of the province's total land and sea area. Mining activities, dominated by tin mining, contributed around 15% to both the employment and provincial economic output of Bangka Belitung.

The tin ores involved are primarily alluvial ores with a large proportion of reserves being offshore tin-rich sand mined through dredging.

== Impacts ==
=== Environmental ===
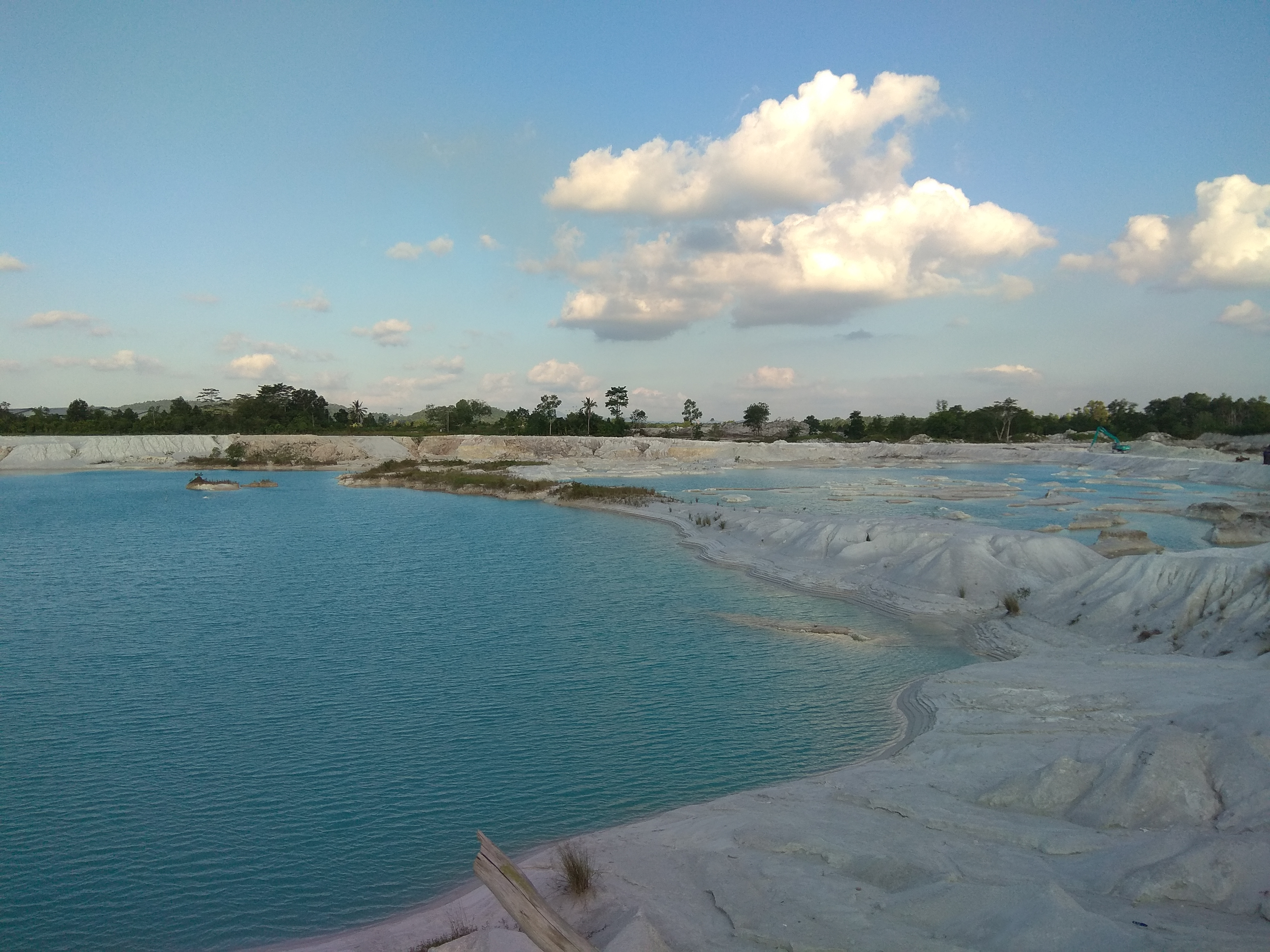
Kaolin Lake in Belitung, a kolong filled with water.

Tin mining activity on Bangka and Belitung has had significant environmental impact. The Indonesian Forum for Environment (WALHI) reported in 2023 that 240,000 hectares of mangrove forests had been damaged by tin mining activities, along with over 5,000 hectares of coral reefs. A series of arrests in 2023 over illegal mining between 2015 and 2022 cited the cost associated with environmental damage at Rp 271 trillion (c. US$17 billion). Large numbers of pepper plantations, the province's other major export commodity, have been converted to illegal mines.

WALHI also tallied over 12,000 unreclaimed open tin mining pits, known locally as kolong, in the province. The pits took up an area of over 15,000 hectares. The kolong are prone to erosion around their rims, and contain blue or green-colored water with high heavy metal content. Due to the unusual shade of the water, along with the white sands surrounding the kolong, some have become tourist attractions, with one in Koba receiving around 100,000 visitors in 2019.

=== Safety ===
Artisanal tin mining remains dangerous; 81 miners were reported killed in working accidents in Indonesia between 2019 and 2023; industry observers estimate that hundreds have died since the spread of small-scale mining. In the same period, 13 children drowned in the kolong water. The miner deaths have been attributed to the lack of safety knowledge among the small-scale miners, who had not been involved in mining activities during the colonial and corporate mining periods. The International Labour Organization estimated in 2015 that there were 6,300 child laborers in tin mining activities in Bangka Belitung.

The kolong have also become colonised by saltwater crocodiles which had been displaced from mangrove forests, resulting in an increase in crocodile attacks on humans.
