= MSY =

MSY or msy can mean:

== Places ==
- Louis Armstrong New Orleans International Airport (IATA airport code MSY), Kenner, Jefferson, Louisiana, USA; serving New Orleans
- Massan railway station (station code MSY), Punjab, Pakistan; a train station
- Merseyside (Chapman code MSY), a county in England, UK
- The Mount School, York (MSY), England United Kingdom; private Quaker day and boarding school

== People ==
- Mulayam Singh Yadav (1939–2022; M. S. Y.), Indian politician
- Moses (given name) (Ancient Egyptian: Msy)
- Masayu (Msy), an Indonesian honorary title found in Sumatra

== Other uses ==
- Aruamu language (ISO 639 language code msy), a language spoken in Papua New Guinea
- Maximum sustainable yield (MSY)
- Massey University School of Aviation (ICAO flight code MSY), New Zealand; see List of airline codes (M)
- Motor sailing yacht (M.S.Y.), a ship prefix for a yacht that can use a motor for propulsion and also sail
- Motorola MSY, a radio; see List of Motorola products
- Million Species Years (MSY), a measurement of Background extinction rate

== See also ==
- Ms Y, a refugee to Ireland involved in Irish court cases concerning abortion in the 2010s
- MSYS
