= Cash coins in Indonesia =

Historical coins in Indonesia

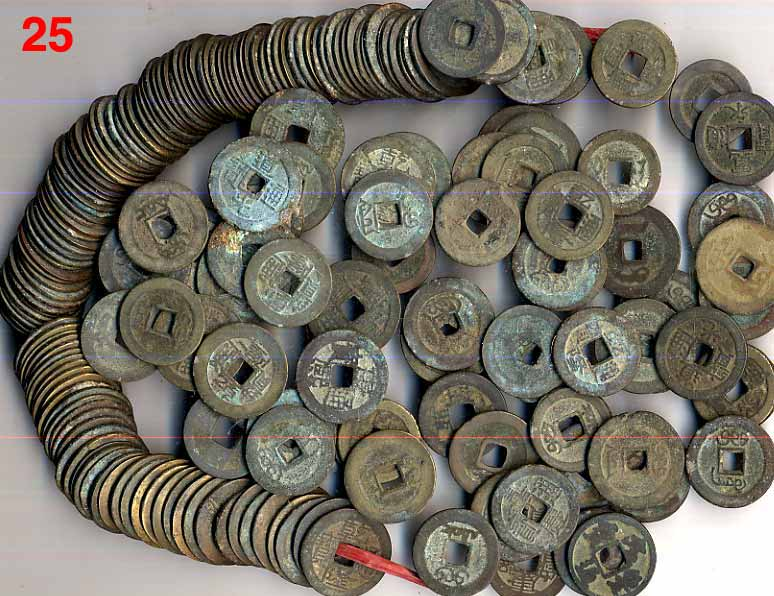
Cash coins found in Indonesia.

The cash coins of Indonesia (Indonesian: Kepeng; Balinese: Pis Bolong; Javanese: Picis, Pitjis, or Gobog) (Note: The spellings of "Kèpèng" and "Pitjis" were used during the Dutch colonial period (see: Van Ophuijsen Spelling System).) (Note: The term "Pitis" was commonly used for smaller denomination tin cash coins.) was a historical currency in Indonesia based on Chinese imperial coinage during the Tang dynasty era (dynasty based in Mainland China). It was introduced by the Chinese traders, but did not become popular in Indonesia until Singhasari defeated the Mongol Empire in 13th century. Chinese cash coins continued to circulate in Indonesian archipelago for centuries; when the Ming dynasty banned trade with the region, many local rulers started creating their own imitations of Chinese cash coins which were often thinner and of inferior quality. Cash coins produced in Indonesia were made from various materials such as copper-alloys, lead, and most commonly tin.

In Indonesia cash coins are often used in various forms of superstitions and rituals which earns them the nickname "magic coins", local cash coin-based amulets (Javanese: ꦒꦺꦴꦧꦺꦴꦒ꧀ꦮꦪꦁ, romanized: Gobog Wayang) based on these cash coins serve a similar place in Indonesian culture as their Chinese counterparts do in Chinese culture, these amulets also date back to the Majapahit period and are used by both the ethnic Chinese and the native population. The ceremonial usage of cash coins is most prevalent on the island of Bali where they can often be found sewn onto clothing as well as made into forms of jewelry and statuary objects. Cash coins in Bali are often sold at shops that cater to tourists, the "junk" and "antique" section of local traditional markets (known as pasar), and in specialised cash coin stores.

The last Chinese cash coins as money circulated in Bali until the year 1970.

== Java ==
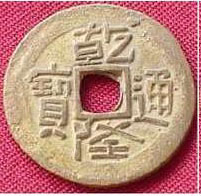
A Javanese imitation of a Chinese Qianlong Tongbao (乾隆通寶) cash coin.

On Java the Chinese picis (cash coins) replaced local gold and silver coins during the Majapahit period, the reason why copper cash coins replaced them was that the size of the local gold and silver coins were too small, so they could easily fall and disappear. While the Chinese picis money has a hole in the middle so they could be strung together with rope with 200 pieces per string and be practically carried around everywhere with ease making them harder to lose. Local gold and silver coins would remain for large transactions while copper picis became the norm for smaller transactions.

During the colonial period the Chinese population were important for the local economy and used picis for their daily transactions in the smaller villages of the countryside which were both imported from China and locally produced, during the period of VOC rule these copper, tin, and lead picis circulated in small villages in lieu of the copper VOC duit pieces.

Javanese imitations of the Kaiyuan Tongbao (開元通寶), Hongwu Tongbao (洪武通寶), Yongle Tongbao (永樂通寶), and the Qianlong Tongbao (乾隆通寶) cash coins are all known to exist, as well as anachronistic copies of Southern Song era coins such as the Xiangfu Yuanbao (祥符元寶) with Manchu mint marks typical of Qing dynasty coinage.

Additionally Ryukyuan cash coins have been known to have circulated on the islands of Java and Sumatra.

== Bali ==
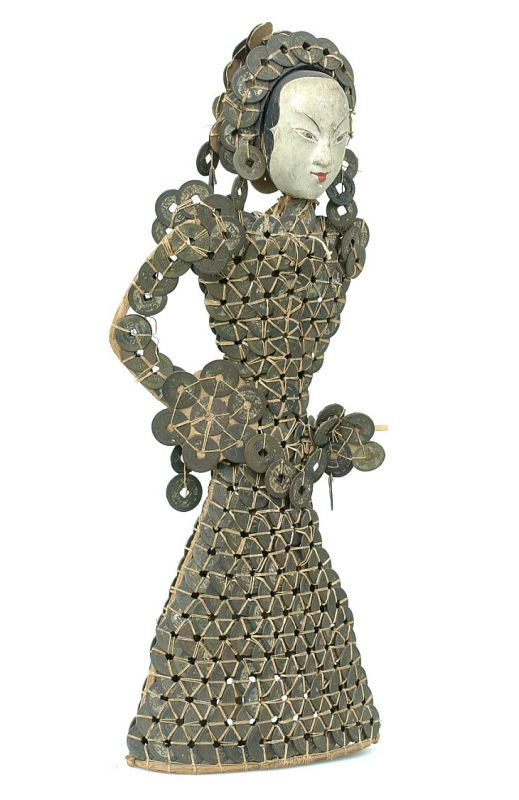
A Balinese statuette of a woman made from Chinese cash coins.

According to a popular legend Chinese cash coins (Balinese: Pis Bolong) were introduced to Bali around the year 12 AD when the ancient Balinese King Sri Maharaja Aji Jayapangus married the Han dynasty princess Kang Cin Wei and the princess asked the King if Chinese cash coins could become a part of all rituals in Bali, which at the time were considered to be one of the most important things in the daily lives of the Balinese people. After which Chinese cash coins would become a part of the Balinese monetary system replacing barter. Another popular story claims that a Chinese traveler named Fa-Hien introduced cash coins to the region when he went on a journey to what are today called India and Sri Lanka but in 414 AD his ship was stranded on Java after his ship was attacked and damaged by storms. The reliability of these stories is questionable as Chinese cash coins only started appearing in the rest of Nusantara around the 13th century, while Dutch historian R. Gorrid claims that cash coins were already known in Bali around 882 AD.

In Bali it is believed that dolls made from cash coins (or Pis Bolong in Balinese) strung together by cotton threads would guarantee that all the organs and body parts of the deceased will be in the right place during their reincarnation.

When the Portuguese and Dutch arrived around the 17th century to the Bali Kingdom, European influence did not suppress the circulation of Balinese cash coins but were supplanted with additional European coinages. After Indonesian independence, cash coins would remain in the daily usage of the Balinese people well after the introduction of the Indonesian rupiah. Cash coins were used by the Balinese people in their day-to-day lives up until the year 1970, where they were used to buy things like household essentials at marketplaces as well food at schools for children.

=== Modern usage ===
Ceremonies in Bali are often considered "incomplete" without the presence of cash coins, however despite their omnipresence in Balinese Hindu rituals the quality of Chinese cash coins has been steadily decreasing while the demand for them has been increasing rocketing sky-high levels due to the explosive population growth the island has experienced. Another reason for this decline in stock is because during certain Balinese rituals and ceremonies such as the Ngaben cremations (also known as Pitra Yadyna or Pelebon) or rituals for the Butha kala (the lower deities of Hinduism), the cash coins cannot be re-used for other ceremonies. The higher demand met with a lower stock of authentic Chinese cash coins have prompted many local Balinese to produce their own rough duplicate cash coins which are often diminutive in size and weight, thinner, and the Traditional Chinese characters on them are often vague or have even completely disappeared. These local duplicates usually sell for 200 rupiah per coin in the year 2008 while authentic Chinese cash coins go for around 1500 rupiah around that time.

Because many people simply don't have a choice many people will buy the modern duplicates while for other people their relatively low price might be the main motivation for their preference because in a minor ritual in a small local temple the quantity of cash coins needed may amount to many thousands of rupiah making it an expensive endeavour if they would prefer authentic Chinese cash coins. Despite this, the usage of imitation cash coins is actually not recommended becoming a rather big problem for many of these rituals, this has become such a big problem that it has come to the attention of the Indonesian government. As a response to this situation Bali Cultural Office formed the Bali Heritage Trust with a vision to keep the local Balinese culture "pure" and in 2004 launched a programme to make localised Balinese versions of Chinese cash coins which was initiated in the Tojan village, Klungkung Regency building a factory there that mass-produces cash coins for Hindu rituals and accessories which is positioned there alongside a showroom for these cash coins and the UD Kamasan Bali, these coins sold for 750 rupiah in 2008 which was higher than other imitations but cheaper than authentic Chinese cash coins. This project was also facilitated by the United Nations Educational, Scientific and Cultural Organization (UNESCO).

The cash coin factory in Tojan has equipment to forge and merge different types of metal in its basement while the front of the factory features the showroom, and at the top floor of the factory is where the cash coins-based accessories are made. This factory produces cash coins which differ greatly from the original Chinese cash coins, one of the ways these new cash coins are different is by the fact that they are produced from an alloy known as Panca Datu (which translates as the "Five Strengths of Life") made from 5 distinct types of metal, these are bronze, copper, iron, silver, and gold which have all have unique meanings in Balinese culture. According to Sukma Swacita (the manager of UD Kamasan Bali in 2008) these cash coins are additionally made from recycled household materials such as broken water taps, second-hand irons. Another feature which sets these cash coins apart from the originals is the fact that instead of having Traditional Chinese characters around the square centre hole these cash coins feature the Balinese characters representing the strength in the four corner points of the compass ("Sa", "Ba", "Ta", and "A"), over these a Hindu lotus symbol is shown. These cash coins are asked for holy blessings in Penganugerahan ceremonies in Pura Besakih and at the Pura Ulun Danu Batur temple in the hopes that this will convince more people to use these cash coins instead of Chinese cash coins, because of these ceremony Hindu priests have started recommending using these new cash coins calling them "a ritual necessity". Other than just the cash coins, this factory also produces small statues made from them such as statues of Bhatara Rambut Sedana who is worshipped by the Hindu people of Bali as the God of Wealth.

Despite this push for these newly made cash coins by the government some people hold on to the older Chinese cash coins for ritualistic purposes because they believe that such coins have divine powers, this is due to their symbolism and association with Wayang characters. Some people believe that cash coins Rejuna (the local name for Arjuna) symbolic markings will supposedly bestow its carrier with the charm and agility of this legendary figure. As of 2008 many people who perform Balinese rituals still prefer original Chinese cash coins over the locally produced versions.

== Sumatra ==
=== Palembang sultanate ===
The Palembang pitis was a currency issued by the Palembang Sultanate made from tin inspired by the Chinese cash coins that circulated in the region, these coins were also strung together and had variants which had holes and without holes.

== See also ==
- Brunei pitis
- Japanese mon (currency)
- Korean mun
- Ryukyuan mon
- Vietnamese cash

== Bibliography ==
- Cribb, Joe (1999). Magic coins of Java, Bali and the Malay Peninsula (288 p., 80 plates with 464 coin illustrations and figures). London: British Museum Press. ISBN 0714108812.
- Supir, Ketut; Sadia, I Wayan; Muderawan, I Wayan (July 2019). "Uang Kepeng in the Globalization Era: Industrialization at Kamasan Village, Klungkung, Bali". Jurnal Bisnis Dan Kewirausahaan. 15 (2): 65–74. doi:10.31940/jbk.v15i2.1409.
