= Palembang Massacre =

1811 killings of Dutch residents in Indonesia

Palembang massacre
- Part of British expedition to Palembang
- Location of the massacre
- Location: Palembang Sultanate, modern day South Sumatra
- Date: September 14 1811
- Target: Dutch garrison/lodge
- Attack type: Execution likely by firing squad
- Weapon: British Brown Bess musket
- Deaths: 87 lodgers
- Perpetrator: Palembang Sultanate

The Palembang Massacre or Sungai Aur Incident was a series of attacks and mass killings of Dutch lodge residents in the Sultanate of Palembang on 18 September 1811. The massacre was carried out by a group of nobles from the Sultanate of Palembang.

== Background ==
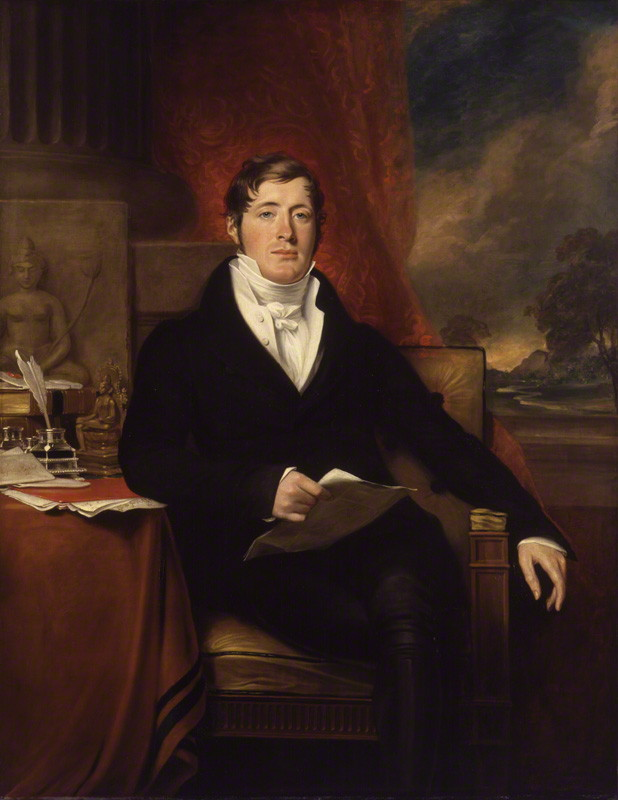
Thomas Stamford Raffles

In late 1810, Thomas Stamford Raffles arrived in Dutch Malacca as the British envoy to the nearby Malayan-Sumatran sultanates He was tasked with establishing relations with the local sultans and nobles, hoping to ally them against the Franco-Dutch forces, or at least be neutral. The British were planning a military expedition to Java, so it was crucial for them to secure the Straits of Malacca and Bangka Belitung Islands, making the Palembang Sultanate was a top priority, as Raffles had received information that Herman Willem Daendels had been preparing a fleet to attack Palembang or the Johorean province of Lingga since September 1810. Another reason for approaching Palembang was so that the British could obtain monopoly rights over Bangka supply over tin.

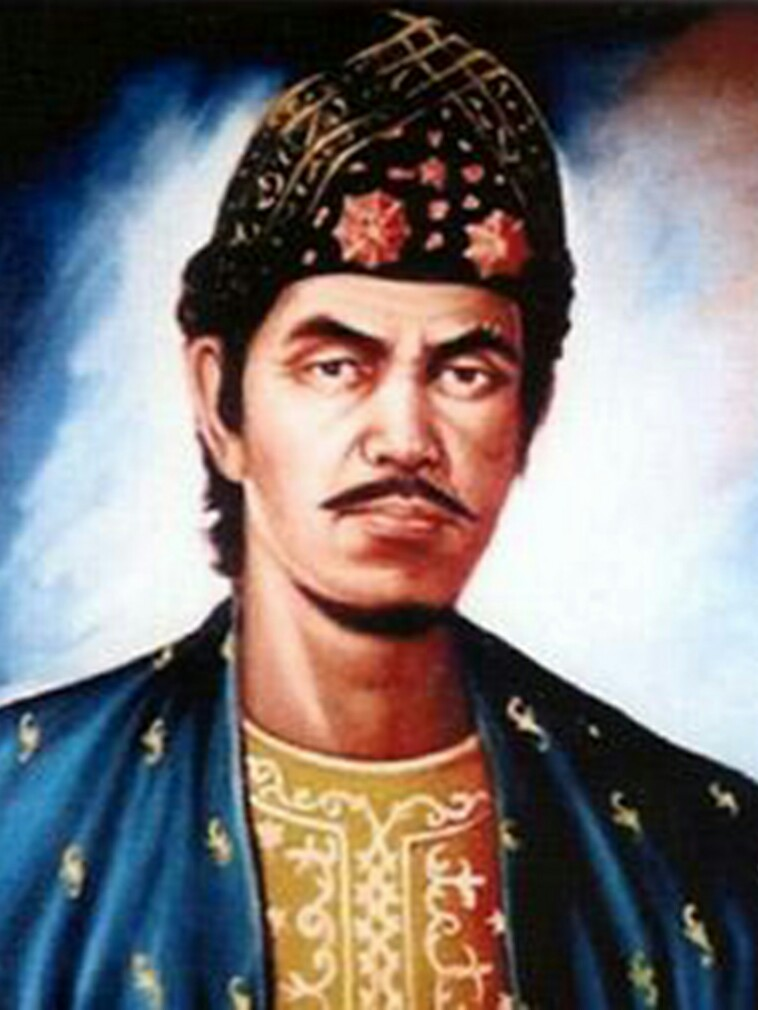
Sultan Mahmud Badaruddin II

Raffles then began corresponding with Mahmud Badaruddin II. He sent two letters in quick succession (without waiting for a reply) on December 10 and 15, 1810, warning Badaruddin of the Dutch fleet heading towards Palembang. He also urged Badaruddin to immediately send envoys to Malacca City to negotiate an alliance with the British. Along with the December 15 letter, Raffles sent Raden Muhammad, a Palembang Malay of noble descent, and Sayyid Abubakar Rumi, an Arab from Penang, to negotiate with Badaruddin. (Note: Raden Muhammad was likely chosen because he was a relative of the Sultan of Palembang and familiar with the intricacies of the Palembang palace. According to one account, he left his country due to heartbreak over Badaruddin's forced divorce. He later settled in Penang and served the British government.)

On January 13, 1811, Raffles sent another letter to Palembang, also issuing a decree to the ngabehi (village heads) in Sungsang, at the mouth of the Musi River, to cease all contact with the Dutch. This message was carried by Captain James Bowen, along with three warships intended to repel the Dutch fleet if necessary. However, Bowen reported ten days later that the Dutch fleet had already departed Palembang on January 10, 1811, having failed to persuade Badaruddin to hand over Palembang's agricultural produce without cash payment. The Sultan also discovered that the Dutch were smuggling weapons on their merchant ships, so he did not allow the fleet to go further upstream.

Having received no further news from his envoy to Badaruddin, Raffles sent Captain MacDonald to meet them in February 1811. It was revealed that Raden Muhammad's mission to meet Badaruddin and discuss an alliance with the British had failed, as he did not have a formal letter of appointment as Raffles' envoy. Nevertheless, the sultan replied to Raffles' letter and asked him not to worry too much about the Dutch presence in Palembang. Raffles responded by sending a letter on March 2, 1811. The following day, he appointed Raden Muhammad as his official envoy to negotiate a draft treaty with Palembang, which offered several benefits such as military assistance and a higher price for tin. In his correspondence with Badaruddin, Raffles once again emphasized that the Dutch intended to attack Palembang, so the sultan should cut ties with the Dutch and make the British his friend. He also urged Badaruddin to immediately expel the Dutch from Palembang. Raffles added that if an alliance between United Kingdom and Palembang was reached before the British invasion of Java, then all contracts in force between Palembang and the Netherlands would be cancelled. However, this did not apply if the alliance was only reached after the occupation of Java.

Badaruddin responded by stating that he was not yet prepared to ally with the British, but would do his best to arrange the expulsion of the Dutch without causing too much trouble. He assured Raffles that the expulsion was only a matter of time. Over the next few months, Raffles and his envoys continually urged Badaruddin to act against the Dutch, but the sultan gave no definite answer. In April, Raffles sent an envoy with a quantity of weaponry like Brown Bess muskets and reiterated that the British would send whatever assistance was necessary to expel the Dutch from Palembang, and would recognize Badaruddin as an independent king if he did so before the British conquered Java. in final response, Badaruddin stated that he had already settled the matter with the Dutch, and that their garrison in Palembang would be withdrawn in the near future. However, Badaruddin still did not send a reply to Raffles or continue negotiations for an alliance. This less than enthusiastic response prompted Raffles to send two of his representatives (Raden Muhammad and Sayyid Abubakar Rumi) to Bangka to investigate its population and natural resources, if Badaruddin would allow them to stay. However, upon their arrival in Muntok on July 22, 1811, the sultan instead invited them to Palembang.

== Incident ==
On September 14, Badaruddin sent several nobles to the Dutch garrison on the Sungai Aur to meet with the Resident of Palembang, Jacob Groenhof van Woortman. There are different versions regarding which nobles were deployed to the Dutch garrison. Testimonies from surviving garrison members mention the names of Raden Ngabehi Carik, Tumenggung Lanang, Raden Muhammad, Tumenggung Suronindito, and several other lower nobles. However, according to Najamuddin II , those who came to the lodge at that time were high nobles such as Prince Citradireja, Prince Natawikrama, Prince Suradilaga, Prince Syarif Usman, Kyai Mas Tumenggung Notonegoro and Kyai Demang Usman. According to one Dutch testimony, the nobles were also accompanied by around 160 armed men, who then disarmed the guards and occupied the lodge within a short time. The total number of occupants of the garrison at that time was only 110 people, including residents of native blood.

Badaruddin's envoy informed Groenhof van Woortman that Dutch had surrendered to the British, and that the Dutch garrison must be empty immediately. The resident replied that they could do nothing without instructions from Holland, and would wait for the British to come and take over the lodge directly. Groenhof van Woortman asked for three days' time, and he sent two men to meet the sultan. Badaruddin then sent two nobles to bring the resident and several other lodge officials to meet him.

On the way to the palace, the group was greeted by nobles who asked the purpose of their visit. Groenhof van Woortman explained that they wanted to request a boat to Holland. Without waiting long, the royal officials provided two pencalang boats and forced the garrison residents to board. They were then taken to the mouth of the Musi River in the Sungsang area and massacred there. The execution was carried out by Prince Wirakusuma, Prince Wiradiwangsa, Prince Wirasentika, Tumenggung Kertonegoro, Demang Usman, Tumenggung Suroyudo, Ngabehi Wiroyudo, Ngabehi Kepinding, Ngabehi Kreto and Ngabehi Jalil.

The total number of fatalities in this massacre was 87 people, which were 24 Dutch and 63 natives. The rest may have fled before the garrison was occupied. Some fled to the homes of Chinese and Arabs, but were later recaptured and detained. Some fled into the forest and survived for 9 months, while others, of native descent, declared they had converted to Islam and taught in one of the hamlets. They survived until rescued by British soldiers who arrived later.

The two British envoys send previously were still in Palembang when the Dutch garrison was occupied and its inhabitants massacred.

== Aftermath ==
The United Kingdom likely rejected claims of her involvement and used the massacre as an excuse to invade Palembang.
