= Banten invasion of Palembang =

1596 invasion

Date	1596
Location	Palembang, Indonesia
Result	Palembang victory

Belligerents
Palembang Sultanate (Portuguese Empire) Portuguese mercenaries	Banten Sultanate; Lampung; Sekala Brak; Darah Putih; Melinting; Balaw

Commanders and leaders
Ki Geding Suto; Prince Madi Angsuko	Maulana Muhammad †; Prince Mas

Strength
Unknown	200 warships

The Banten invasion of Palembang was a military conflict between the Palembang Sultanate, with the support of Portuguese mercenaries, against the Banten Sultanate. Launched by Sultan Maulana Muhammad, it had the aim of conquering the sultanate, in order to control the pepper trade. According to other sources, the invasion was also launched because Maulana Muhammad was incited by Prince Mas, who wished to become king of Palembang.

== Background ==
The invasion was encouraged by Prince Mas, who wanted Palembang conquered. If Palembang was conquered, Banten's economy would increase due to the pepper trade. There were also reports that many people in Palembang had not yet converted to Islam, which also encouraged Maulana Muhammad to launch his invasion. However, this order was initially opposed by other nobles, but Maulana Muhammad, who was only 25 years old, ignored the opposition and proceeded with his plans. If the conquest succeeded, Prince Mas would be installed as a ruler under Banten's control. Maulana Muhammad then began gathering troops from all across Banten.

== Invasion ==
The invasion was led and launched by Maulana Muhammad himself. Banten prepared 200 warships for this mission, and instructed Lampung, already loyal to Banten, to assemble its ground forces, while they attacked from the sea. Other sources also claim that the invasion was supported by Cirebon, Demak, Pakuan, and Galuh.

=== Battle of the Musi River ===
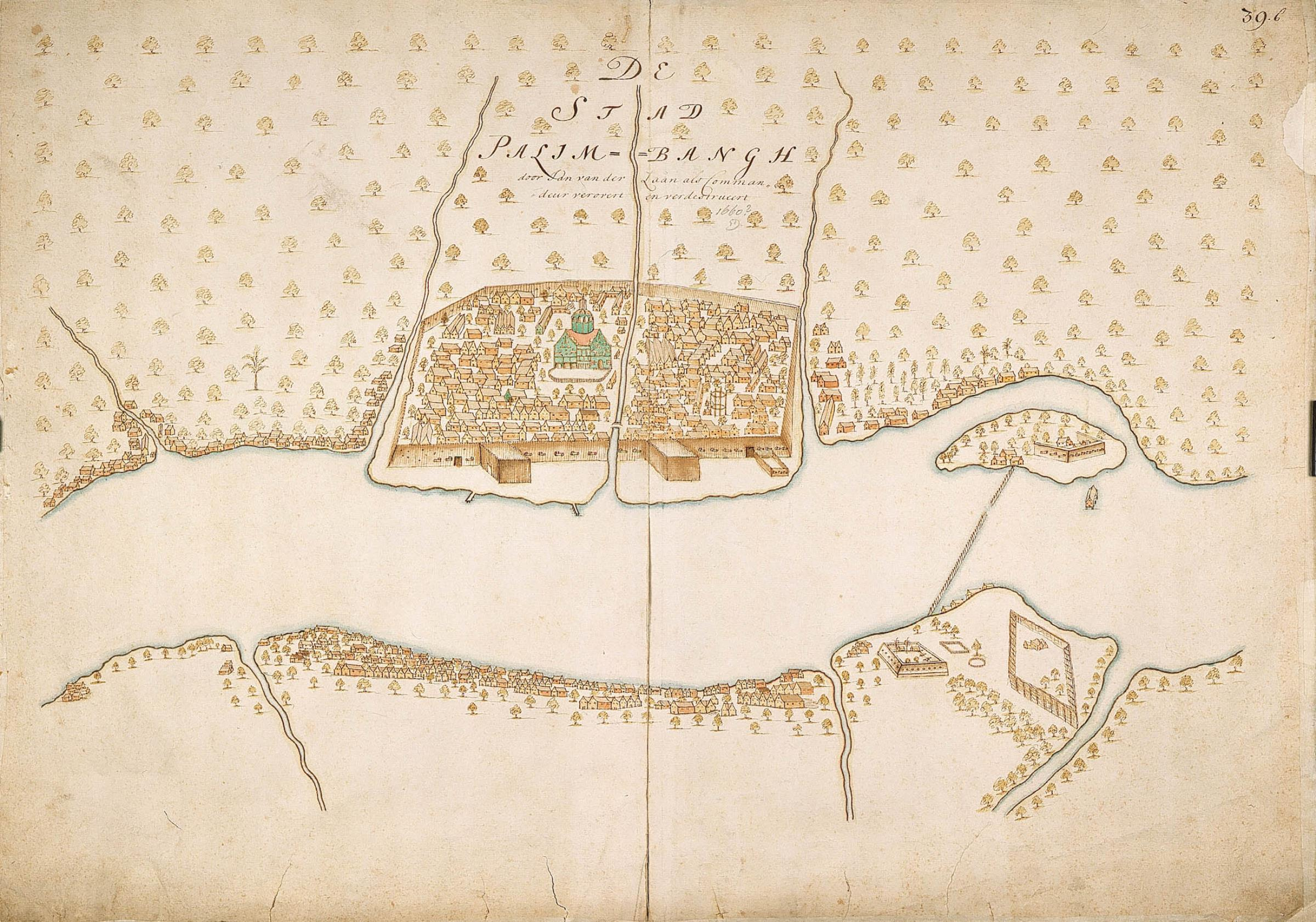
View of Palembang and the Musi River, c. 1660

After preparing sea and land forces, Maulana Muhammad ordered his troops to siege the city of Palembang. Intense fighting occurred for several days, and the city was surrounded by land and sea. The Palembang forces eventually retreated to the royal palace fortress, however, during the battle, a shot from the palace, by Portuguese bombers at the service of Palembang, struck Maulana Muhammad in the chest, killing him. Banten's commander tried to shield him, but was himself struck by an arrow. Both Maulana Muhammad and his commander died aboard the ship Indrajaladri.

== Aftermath ==
Upon hearing that their Sultan had fallen in battle, Banten's forces were ordered to call off the invasion and retreat empty-handed. The invasion ended, and Banten's army retreated.
