= First expedition to Palembang =

- Part of the Dutch colonization of Indonesia
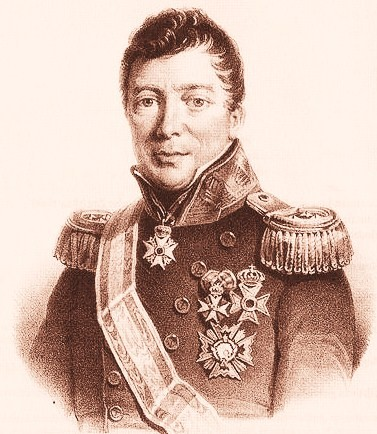
- Portrait of Constantijn Johan Wolterbeek, who led the expedition
Date	22 August – 30 October 1819
Location	Palembang Sultanate
Result	Palembang victory

Belligerents
Palembang Sultanate	Netherlands

Commanders and leaders
Mahmud Badaruddin II	Constantijn Johan Wolterbeek

Strength
Unknown	5 warships 3 troopships 1,500 troops

Casualties and losses
Unknown	29 killed 60 wounded

The first expedition to Palembang was a punitive expedition carried out Dutch forces, including the Royal Netherlands East Indies Army, against the Palembang Sultanate in 1819. It ended in a failure for the Dutch.

== See also ==
- Second expedition to Palembang

== Sources ==
- 1900. W.A. Terwogt. Het land van Jan Pieterszoon Coen. Geschiedenis van de Nederlanders in oost-Indië. P. Geerts. Hoorn
- 1900. G. Kepper. Wapenfeiten van het Nederlands Indische Leger; 1816-1900. M.M. Cuvee, Den Haag.'
- 1876. A.J.A. Gerlach. Nederlandse heldenfeiten in Oost Indë. Drie delen. Gebroeders
