= Second expedition to Palembang =

- Part of the Dutch colonization of Indonesia
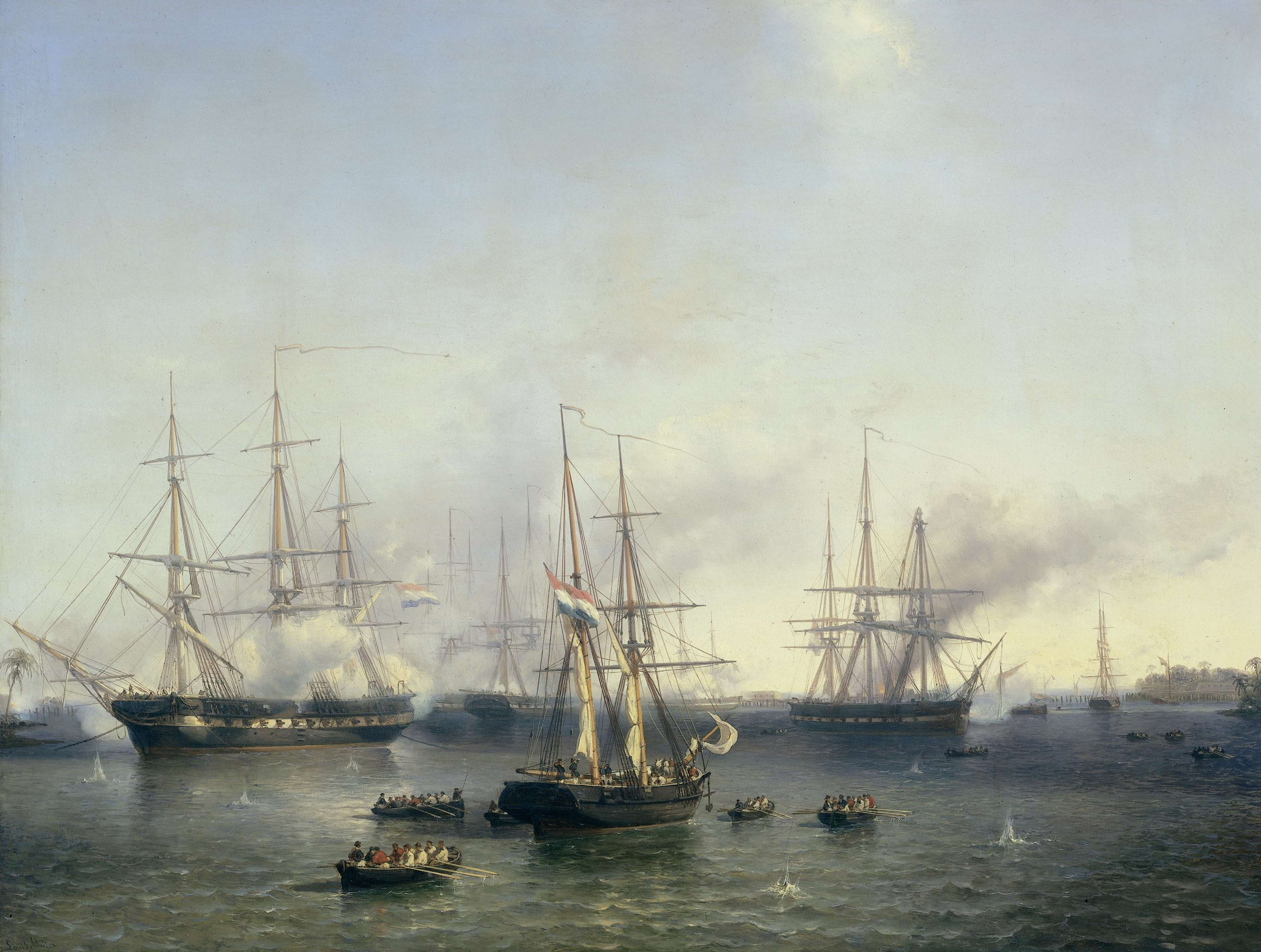
- The capture of Palembang by lieutenant-general Baron de Kock, 24 June 1821; Louis Meijer, 1857
Date	June 1821
Location	Palembang, Palembang Sultanate
Result	Dutch victory

Belligerents
Netherlands	Palembang Sultanate

Commanders and leaders
Hendrik Merkus; François de Stuers	Mahmud Badaruddin

Strength
4,179	Unknown

Casualties and losses
95 killed 220 wounded	Unknown

The second expedition to Palembang was a punitive expedition by the Dutch against the Palembang Sultanate in 1821. The commander of the expedition, Hendrik Merkus de Kock, succeeded in coming to an agreement with Sultan Mahmud Badaruddin II.

== See also ==
- First expedition to Palembang

== Sources ==
- 1900. W.A. Terwogt. Het land van Jan Pieterszoon Coen. Geschiedenis van de Nederlanders in oost-Indië. P. Geerts. Hoorn
- 1900. G. Kepper. Wapenfeiten van het Nederlands Indische Leger; 1816-1900. M.M. Cuvee, Den Haag.'
- 1876. A.J.A. Gerlach. Nederlandse heldenfeiten in Oost Indë. Drie delen. Gebroeders
