= Mahmud Badaruddin I =

Sultan of Palembang Sultanate

Sultan Mahmud Badaruddin Jayo Wikramo

4th Sultan of Palembang
- Reign: 1724–1757
- Predecessor: Agung Komaruddin
- Successor: Ahmad Najamuddin I
- Born: Palembang, Sultanate of Palembang
- Died: 1757; Sultanate of Palembang.
- Issue: Ahmad Najamuddin I
Names
- Mahmud Badaruddin Jayo Wikramo
Regnal name
- Sultan Mahmud Badaruddin I
- House: Azmatkhan
- Father: Sultan Muhammad Mansyur
- Mother: Nyimas Sunguk of Jambi
- Religion: Islam

Mahmud Badaruddin I, also known as Jayo Wikramo, was the fourth Sultan of Palembang, South Sumatra. Mahmud Badaruddin I reigned the Palembang Sultanate between 1724 and 1757.

== Reign ==
Mahmud Badaruddin I was the sovereign of the Sultanate of Palembang between 1724 and 1757. His coronation ended a period of power struggle between the royal families which have continued since the death of Sultan Abdurrahman in 1706, the first regent of the Sultanate.

During the reign of Mahmud Badaruddin I, the role of pepper as the main commodity of Palembang was gradually replaced by tin. Mahmud Badaruddin succeeded in ensuring the sovereignty of Palembang over tin-producing islands of Bangka and Belitung which was formerly managed by the Bugis. In 1731, with the help of the Dutch East India Company, Mahmud Badaruddin I defeated a revolt started by the Bugis people in Bangka. Since then he brought Chinese miners onto the islands. Mahmud Badaruddin I himself married a Peranakan Chinese as one of his wives. Mahmud Badaruddin I appointed several Chinese Muslims as officials for tin mining in Bangka. At the end of his reign, there were around 25,000-30,000 Chinese who resided in Bangka.

Mahmud Badaruddin I managed to rule with peace and improved trade in the Sultanate. He gained the support of the nobles by maintaining thought-exchange and communications with them. The Dutch East India Company did not interfere with his administration because of the deteriorating financial condition of the Dutch East India Company at that time, as well as the apparent stronger competition with the British Empire and the strengthening power of the Bugis in the western part of the Indies. The biggest conflict faced by the Palembang Sultanate during the reign of Mahmud Badaruddin I was the conflict with the Banten Sultanate, especially the fight over the region of Lampung. At that time, the region of Lampung is known as a producer of pepper, as well as gold since the 1730s. Even though the Dutch East India Company mediated the conflict in 1738 and won the claim of Lampung to Banten, Mahmud Badaruddin maintained close relation with the ponggawa (chiefs) of Tulang Bawang Kingdom and the other rulers in Lampung, that they decided to maintain trade with the merchants of Palembang.

== Death ==
Mahmud Badaruddin was buried in the cemetery complex of Kawang Tengkurep, located in Belabak Street, 3 Ilir, Palembang. The construction of the cemetery complex was ordered by Mahmud Badaruddin himself for his family, relatives, and other high officials of the Sultanate. Some Sultans of Palembang were also buried in the Kawang Tengkurep cemetery complex.

== See also ==
- Mahmud Badaruddin II
- Palembang Sultanate
