= Masagus =

Honorific title

Masagus (Mgs) is an honorific title held by people in Palembang, South Sumatra, indicating descendant from the family of Sultan Mahmud Badaruddin II. The female variant of this title is Masayu (Msy).

The title is both honorary and hereditary, of patrilineal descendant. Therefore, if a common man marries a Masayu woman, his children will not bear this title. Though one may be identified as a respected member of Palembang society, the bearer of the title does not gain any specific privileges in Palembang society itself.
