= Dutch East India Company coinage =

Coins minted by the Dutch East India Company

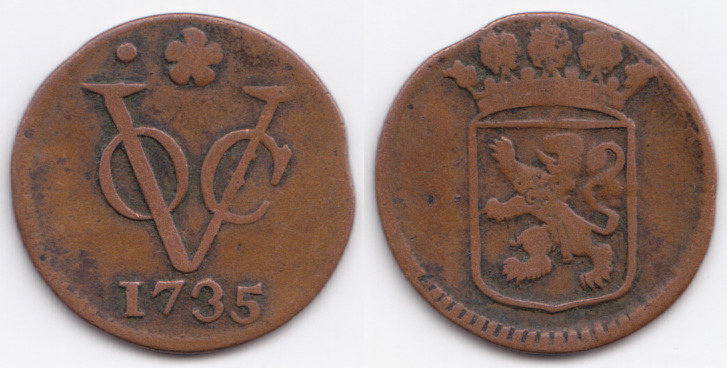
A bronze doit of the Dutch East India Company, depicting the VOC monogram and its date of production on its obverse and the coat of arms of Holland on the reverse.

The Dutch East India Company (Dutch: Vereenigde Oostindische Compagnie, often known as VOC) was a chartered company which issued a considerable series of coinage in bronze, silver and gold for its territories in the Far East between 1602 and 1799.

== Background ==
The Dutch East India Company (VOC) was established as a chartered company in 1602 and was designed to replace a number of earlier Dutch trading companies. To prevent the constant infighting between rival companies, the Dutch States-General gave the company officially recognised status and allowed it fulfill some functions usually reserved for a state. The company's charter allowed it to have its own military forces, make treaties, and coin its own money. It was given full powers to act between the Cape of Good Hope and the Straits of Magellan. The company grew rapidly, founding towns and colonies at Cape Town, Batavia (modern Jakarta), and elsewhere.

== Coins ==
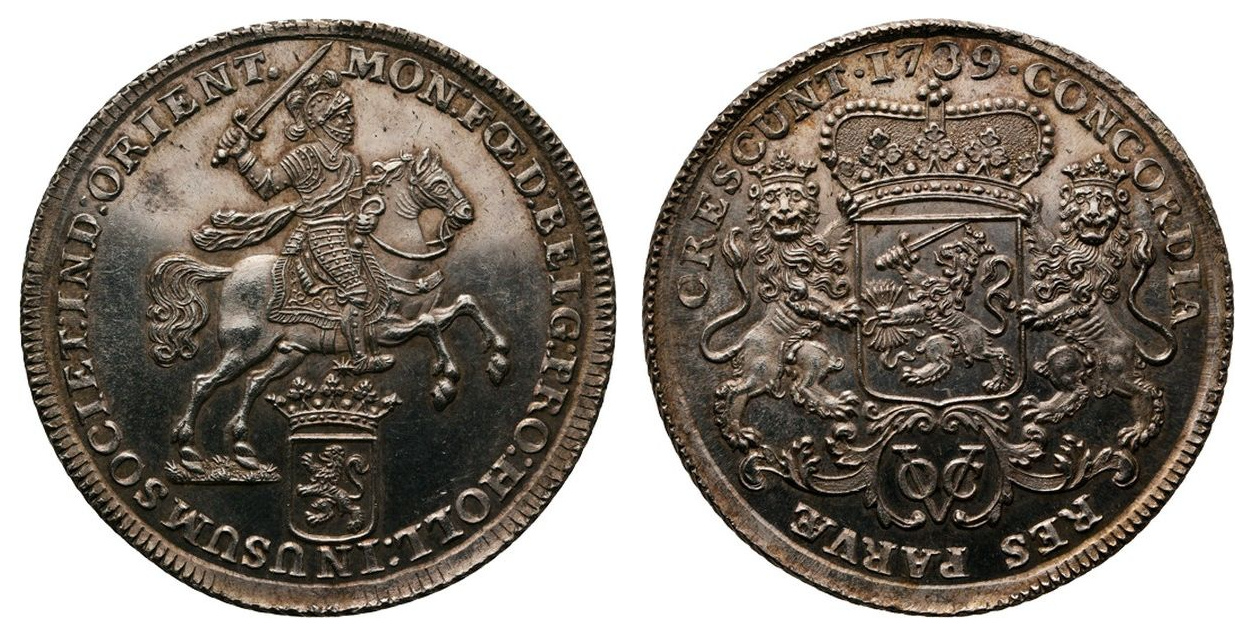
Ducaton or silver rider struck by the province of Holland for the company in 1739. The obverse legend ends IN USUM SOCIET: IND: ORIENT ("for the use of the East India Company") and the VOC monogram appears in a cartouche below the arms on the reverse.

During the 200 years of its existence, VOC issued large quantities and many different patterns of coins. Writers on the subject distinguish between the types produced in the Netherlands for the company and those issued by it locally in Asia. Both types often circulated together, but European coins were more common in some areas than others. Most coins issued for the company carried its distinctive monogram of the interlocked letters "VOC". The most common denominations were the Guilder, Ducatoon, Stiver (or Stuiver) and Doit (Duit). Some fractions, like the Half-Doit, were also produced. The half duit was introduced in 1750 for the convenience of poorer residents, particularly those living in the countryside.

Coins were issued in the Netherlands during the mid-17th century and again from 1744 until its dissolution. Coins were struck in gold, silver, bronze and, unusually, pewter. They were issued by the local mints of the Netherlands, including Holland, Utrecht, Zeeland, Gelderland and Overijssel.

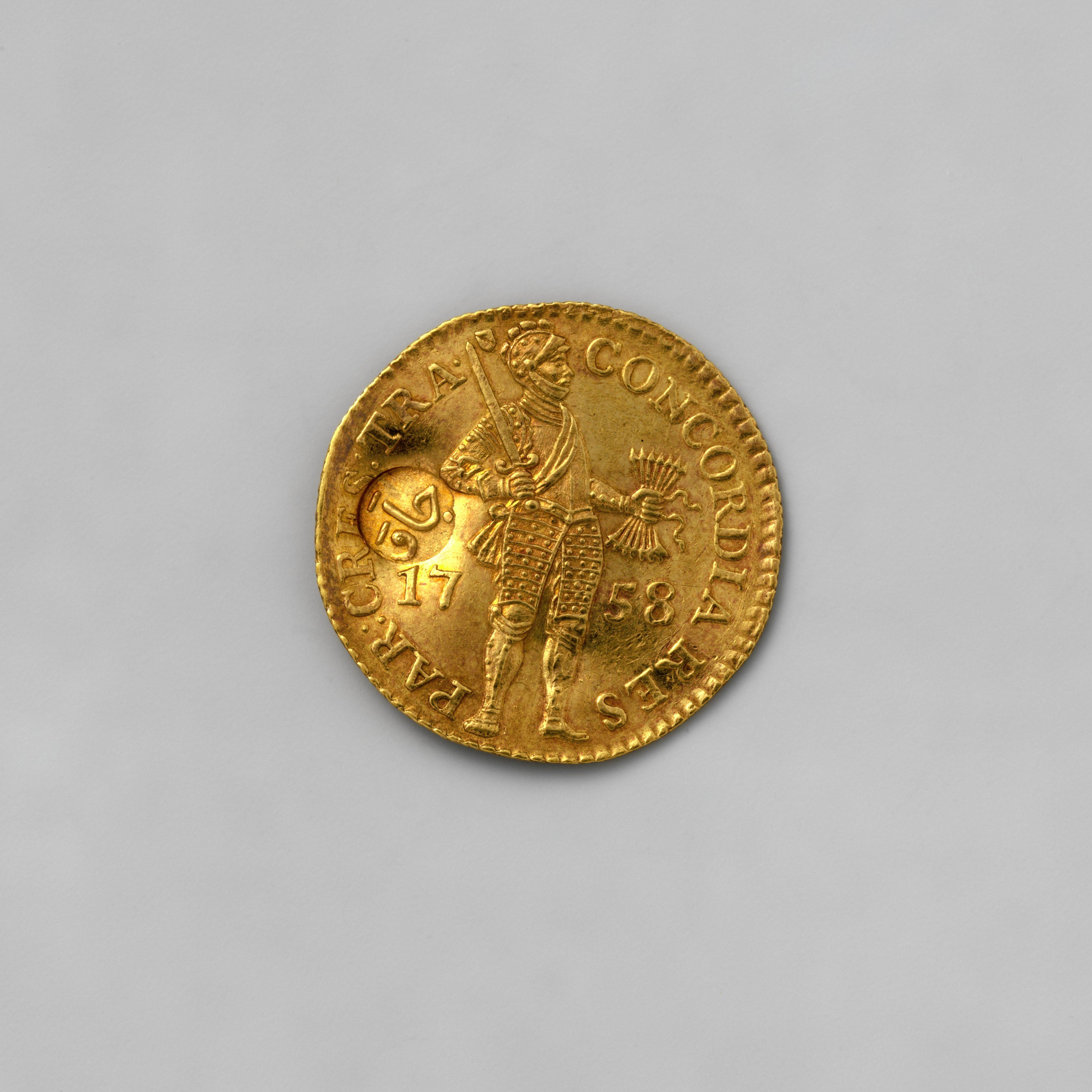
Gold ducat of Utrecht, 1758, with a "Djawa" countermark applied in Asia

The locally produced coins in Asia display more variation and were produced in gold, silver and bronze. Countermarks are sometimes seen on these coins, either stamped by the company or by local private individuals. Foreign coins, including Japanese Koban or Surat rupees, were sometimes countermarked by the company for its own use.

=== Circulation on Java ===
Between 1724 and 1795 the company shipped more than 1.1 billion copper duiten from the Dutch Republic to Java. They nevertheless made up a small part of what the company sent east: duiten accounted for about 1.2 per cent of its total exports of coin and bullion by value, against at least 78 per cent in silver. Because Batavia served as the company's central hub in Asia, part of each shipment was redistributed elsewhere; on average some 72 per cent of the imported duiten stayed on Java and 28 per cent was re-exported. During the second half of the eighteenth century most of the duiten were sent to the company's office at Semarang, which acted as the gateway to the principality of Mataram.

The company obtained the right of coinage on Java from the susuhunan of Mataram in 1743, but struck duiten there on only two occasions, in 1764 and 1783, when shipments from the Republic faltered; local production remained marginal beside the imports.

== See also ==
- Netherlands Indies gulden
- Dutch East India Company in Indonesia
- Spice trade
