= Palembang Sultanate =

Indonesian sultanate from 1659 to 1823

Palembang Darussalam كسلطانن ڤلمبڠ دارالسلام Kesultanan Palembang Darussalam
- 1659–1823
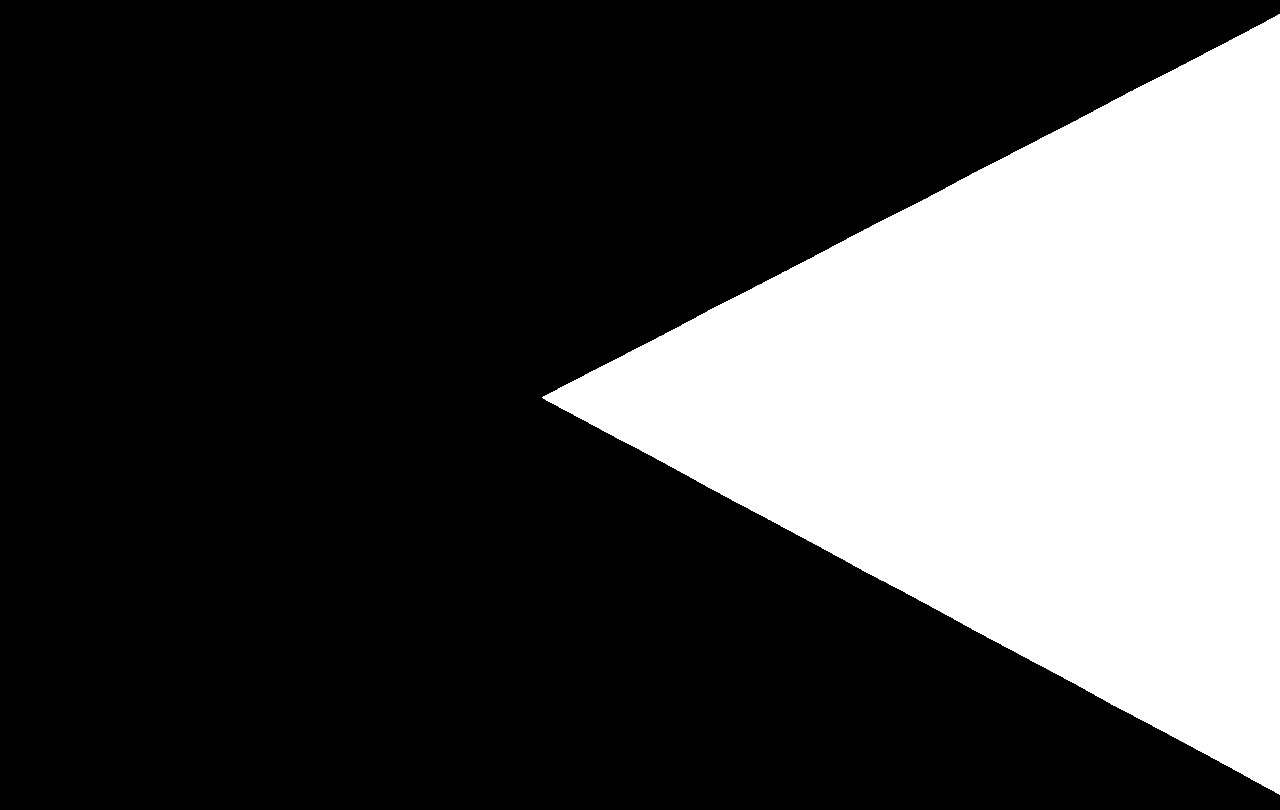
- Flag

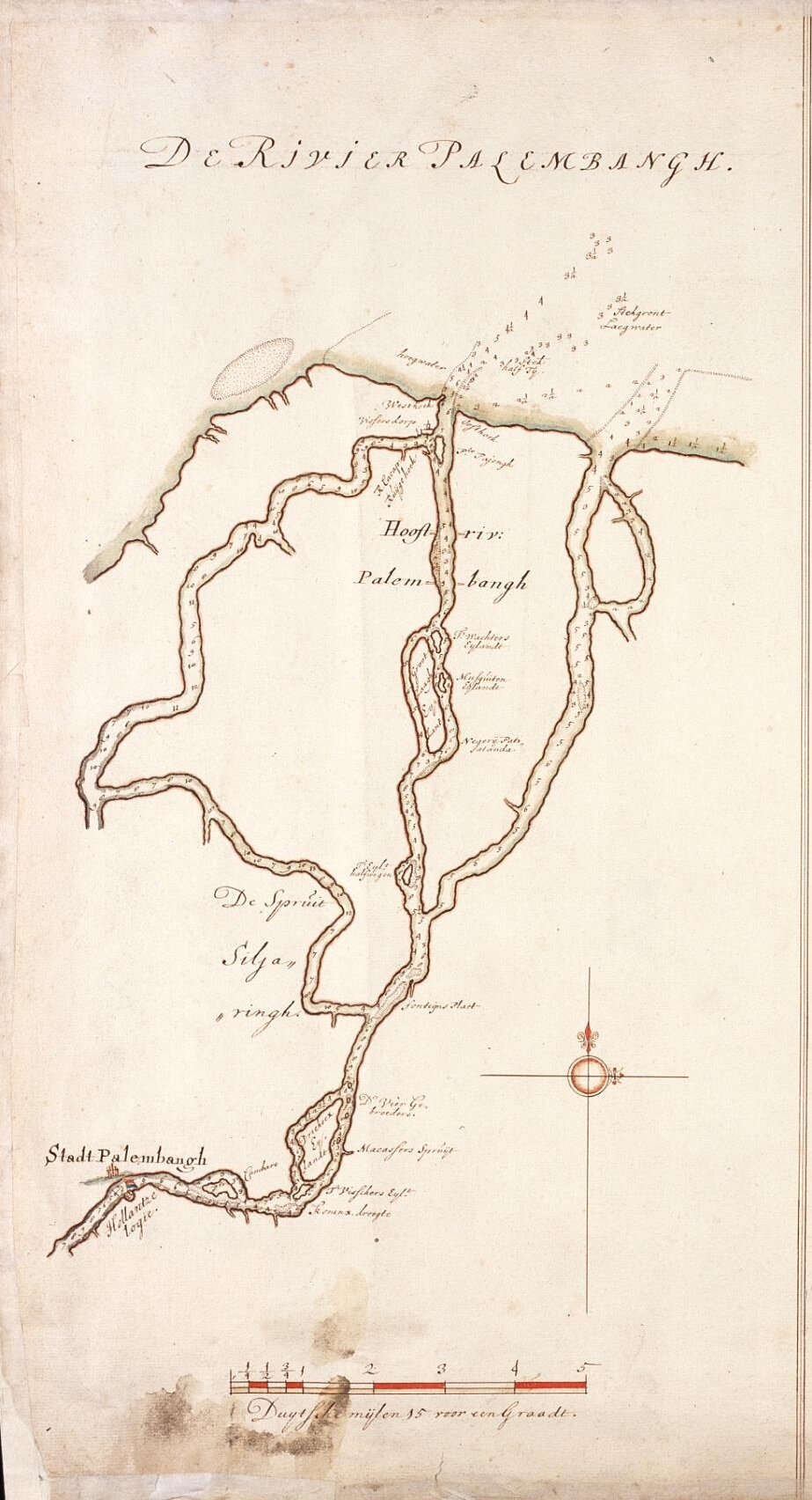
- The Palembang Sultanate maintained control of territory from the Musi river delta to the Palembang city at the bottom of the river.
- Capital: Palembang; Kuto Lamo (1659–1797); Kuto Besak (1797–1823)
- Common languages: Malay language
- Religion: Islam
- Government: Monarchy
- Sultan
  - 1659–1704: Susuhunan Abdurrahman
  - 1819–1821: Mahmud Badaruddin II
  - 1821–1823: Ahmad Najamuddin IV
- History
  - Established: 1659
  - First expedition to Palembang: 1819
  - Second expedition to Palembang: 1821
  - Abolished by Dutch colonial authorities, absorbed into the Dutch East Indies: 7 October 1823
- Currency: Palembang pitis, Spanish real
Preceded by	Succeeded by
Demak Sultanate	Dutch East Indies; Palembang
- Today part of: Indonesia; South Sumatra; Bangka Belitung; parts of Bengkulu; parts of Jambi; parts of Lampung

The Sultanate of Palembang Darussalam (Malay: كسلطانن ڤلمبڠ دارالسلام, romanized: Kesultanan Palembang Darussalam) was an early modern polity and sultanate located in the southern part of the Indonesian island of Sumatra. It was ruled by the Sultans of Palembang. It was proclaimed in 1659 by Susuhunan Abdurrahman, and dissolved by the colonial government of the Dutch East Indies on 7 October 1823. In 1825, its last ruler, Sultan Ahmad Najamuddin IV, was arrested and sent into exile on the island of Banda Neira in the Moluccas.

== History ==
=== Establishment and early records ===
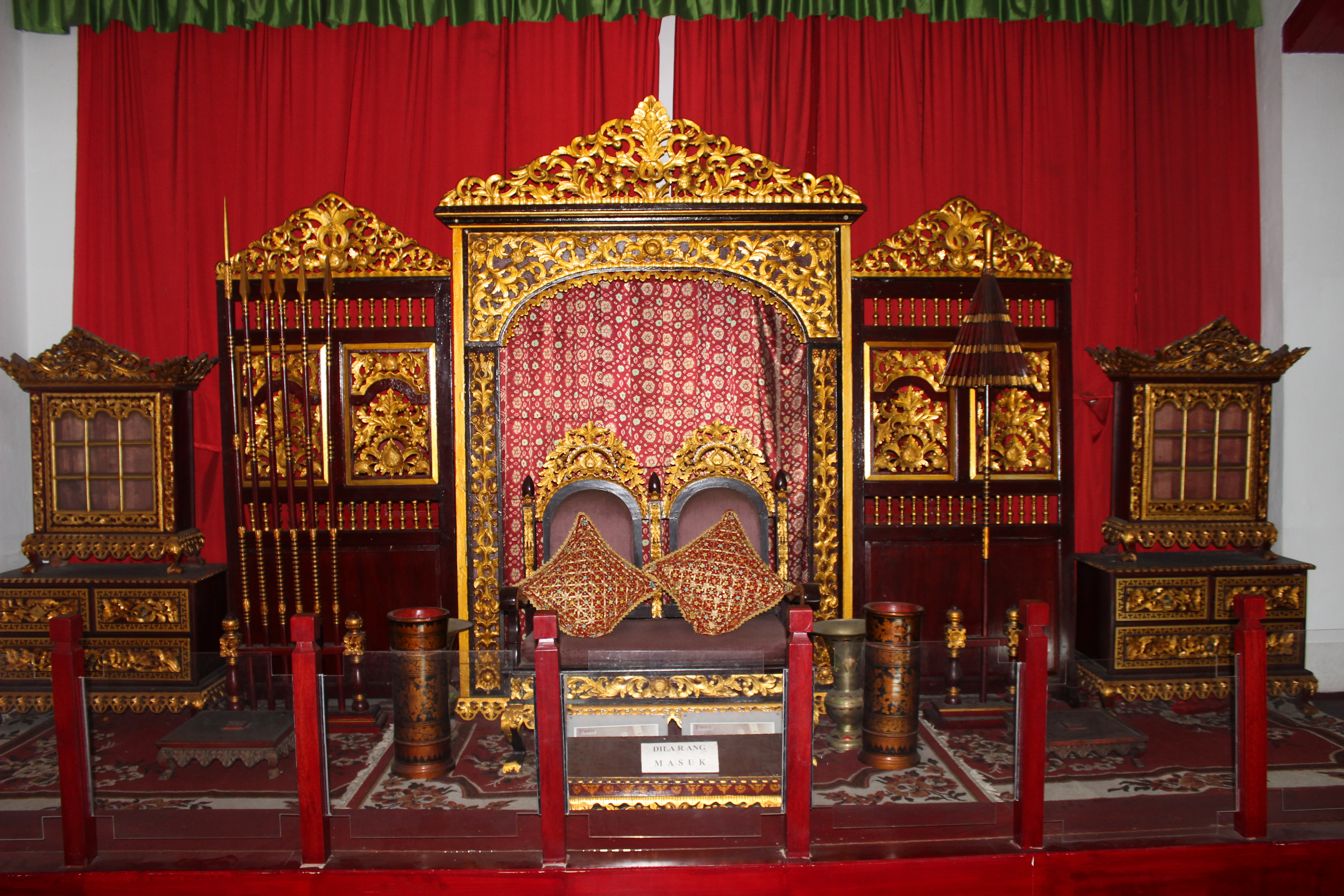
Replica of the throne of the Palembang Sultanate.

According to the story of Kidung Pamacangah and Babad Arya Tabanan it was said that a figure from Kediri named Arya Damar who was a "regent of Palembang" joined Gajah Mada, ruler of Majapahit in conquering Bali in 1343. Historian C.C. Berg thought that Arya Damar was identical to Adityawarman. The name Palembang was also mentioned in Nagarakretagama as one of the conquered lands of Majapahit. Gajah Mada also mentioned the name Palembang in Pararaton as one of the regions that he conquered.

A Chinese chronicle Chu-fan-chi written in 1178 by Chou-Ju-Kua recorded the name Pa-lin-fong, a reference to Palembang. Around 1513, Tomé Pires an adventurer from Portugal mentioned Palembang, a kingdom which is led by a patron who was appointed from Java and was then referred to as the Sultanate of Demak and participated in the invasion of Portuguese Controlled Melaka. In 1596, Palembang was attacked and razed by the Dutch East India Company. In 1659, the name Sri Susuhunan Abdurrahman was recorded as sovereign of the Palembang Sultanate. Records of connection with the VOC have been mentioned since the year 1601.

=== Kraton Kuto Gawang ===
At the beginning of the 17th century, Palembang became one of the centers of Islam in Indonesia. The precursor of the sultanate in Palembang was founded by Ki Gede ing Suro, a nobleman from the Demak Sultanate, who took refuge in friendly Palembang during the troubles following the death of Trenggana of Demak. On the north bank of the Musi River, he and the nobilities established a kraton, the Kuto Gawang. It was located quite strategically on the riverfront of the Musi, in the present 2-Ilir District, within what is now the complex of PT. Pupuk Sriwidjaja, a state-run fertilizer manufacturer. The Kraton of Kuto Gawang was surrounded by a square-shaped fortification made of 30 centimetres (12 in) thick ironwood and ulin wood. It is described to be about 290 Rijnlandsche roede (1093 meters) in length and width. The height of the wooden ramparts is more than 24 feet (7.3 m). The Kraton stretches between what is now Plaju and Pulau Kemaro, a small island located in the middle of the Musi River.

The Kraton of Kuto Gawang was sketched by Joan van der Laen in 1659. The sketch shows a fortified city facing the Musi River with the Rengas River running through the middle part of the city from north to south. The Taligawe River is located to the east of Kuto Gawang, while to the west is the Buah River. In the middle of Kuto Gawang is a structure, possibly a mosque, located to the west of the Rengas River. The Kraton was described to also have three stone bastions. Foreigners (e.g. the Chinese and Portuguese) were known to settle on the banks of the Musi River opposite of the Kraton, to the west of the mouth of the Komering River.

In 1659, the Dutch of the Dutch East India Company attacked and razed Kraton Kuto Gawang. The Susuhunan (king) Abdurrahman later moved his court to a new site called Beringin Janggut.

=== Kraton Beringin Janggut ===
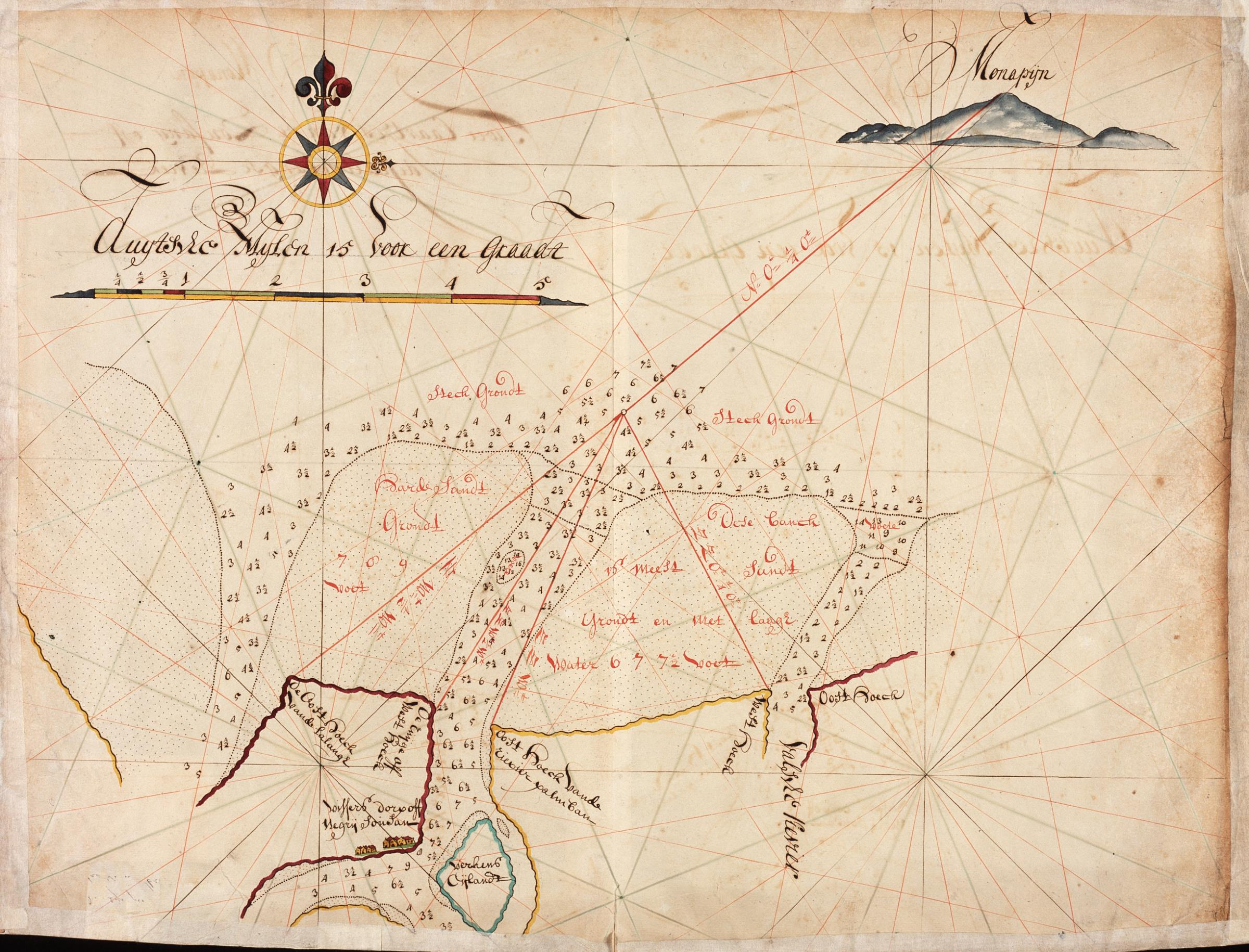
Map of the mouth of Musi River, part of Palembang Sultanate.

After the Kuto Gawang was destroyed by the Dutch East India Company forces in 1659, Susuhunan Abdurrahman ordered the court to move to the new Kraton, the Beringin Janggut, which was located in the vicinity of the Old Mosque (now Jalan Segaran). There is no written record of how is the shape, size, or existence of Beringin Janggut.

The area of the Kraton Beringin Janggut was known to be surrounded by a network of canals: the Musi River to the south, the Tengkuruk River to the west, Penedan canal to the north, and Rendang or Karang Waru River to the east. The Penedan Canal was connected with the Kemenduran, Kapuran, and Kebon Duku canals. The network of canals was the main mode of transportation for people during this period of the Sultanate.

=== Kraton Kuto Tengkuruk ===
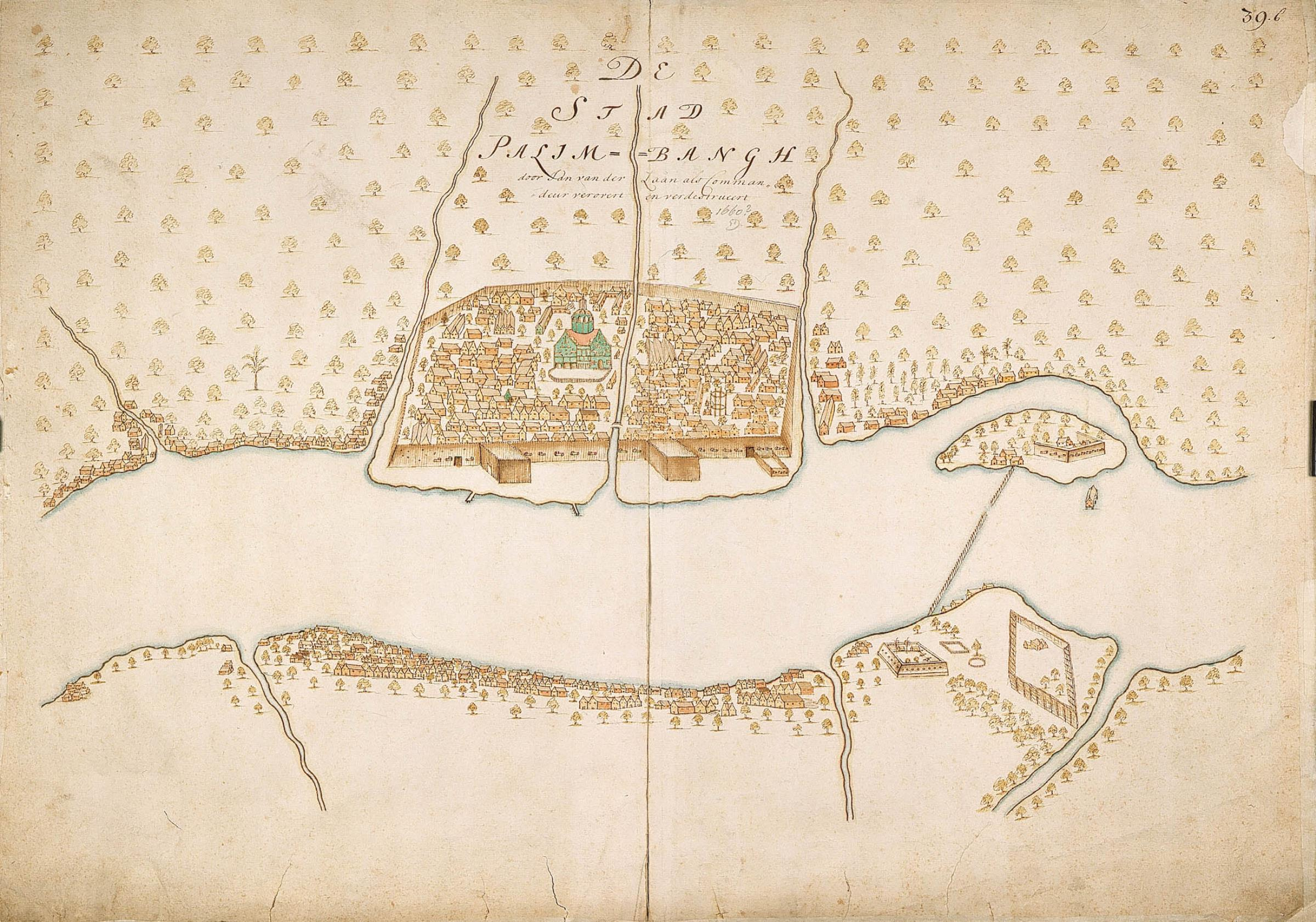
Ancient map of Palembang, possibly dated to 1650s.

During the reign of Sultan Mahmud Badaruddin I, the fifty-hectares wide Kraton Kuto Tengkuruk or Kuto Lamo (lit. 'old palace') became the main center of the Palembang Sultanate. Kraton Kuto Tengkuruk was bordered with Kapuran River (now Pasar Cinde) to the north, Tengkuruk River to the east (in what is now the complex of Pupuk Sriwidjaja Palembang), River Musi to the south, and Sekanak River (now Lambidaro River in 36 Ilir) to the west. The landmarks of Kraton Kuto Tengkuruk were the domed Great Mosque and the palace proper of Kuto Batu / Kuto Tengkuruk. Sultan Muhammad Bahauddin (reigned 1776–1803) had Kuto Besak's palace built. In 1821, the Dutch attacked Palembang again and annexed the city. The sultanate is dissolved and the fort of Kuto Tengkuruk, deconstructed. The Dutch have built in its place an administrative residence which is now the Sultan Mahmud Badaruddin II museum.

=== Kraton Kuto Besak (1797–1823) ===
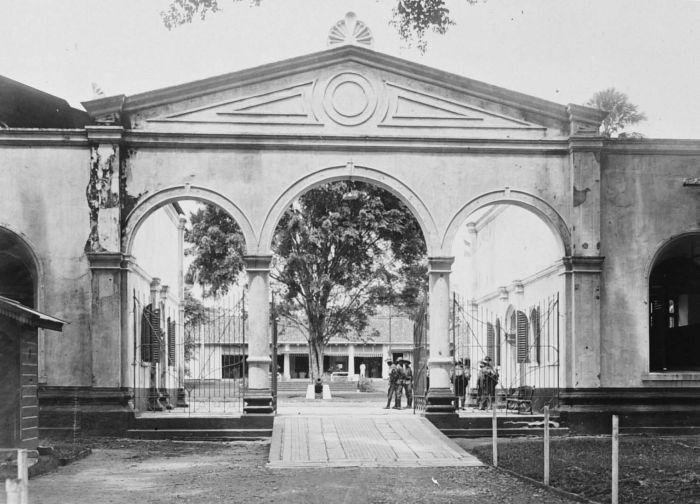
The main portal to Kuto Besak, the Kuto Lawang.

During the reign of Sultan Muhamad Bahaudin (1776–1803), the Kraton Kuto Besak (lit. 'great palace') was built, and was completed in 1797. It is the largest kraton the Palembang Sultanate had built and the only remaining kraton today. Renovations over time have altered the appearance of the kraton. Kuto Besak was located to the west of the site of old Kuto Tengkuruk. The site of Kuto Besak has a length of 288.75 meters, width of 183.75 meters, wall heightof 9.99 meters, and wall thickness of 1.99 meters which ran long east–west direction (upstream-downstream Musi). In every corner of the fortification wall are bastions, and the portal to the fortified city is located on the eastern, southern, and western sides. The southern portal is the main gate, known as Lawang Kuto. The secondary portals are known as Lawang Buratan, one portal still exists to the west of the Kuto Besak in present time.

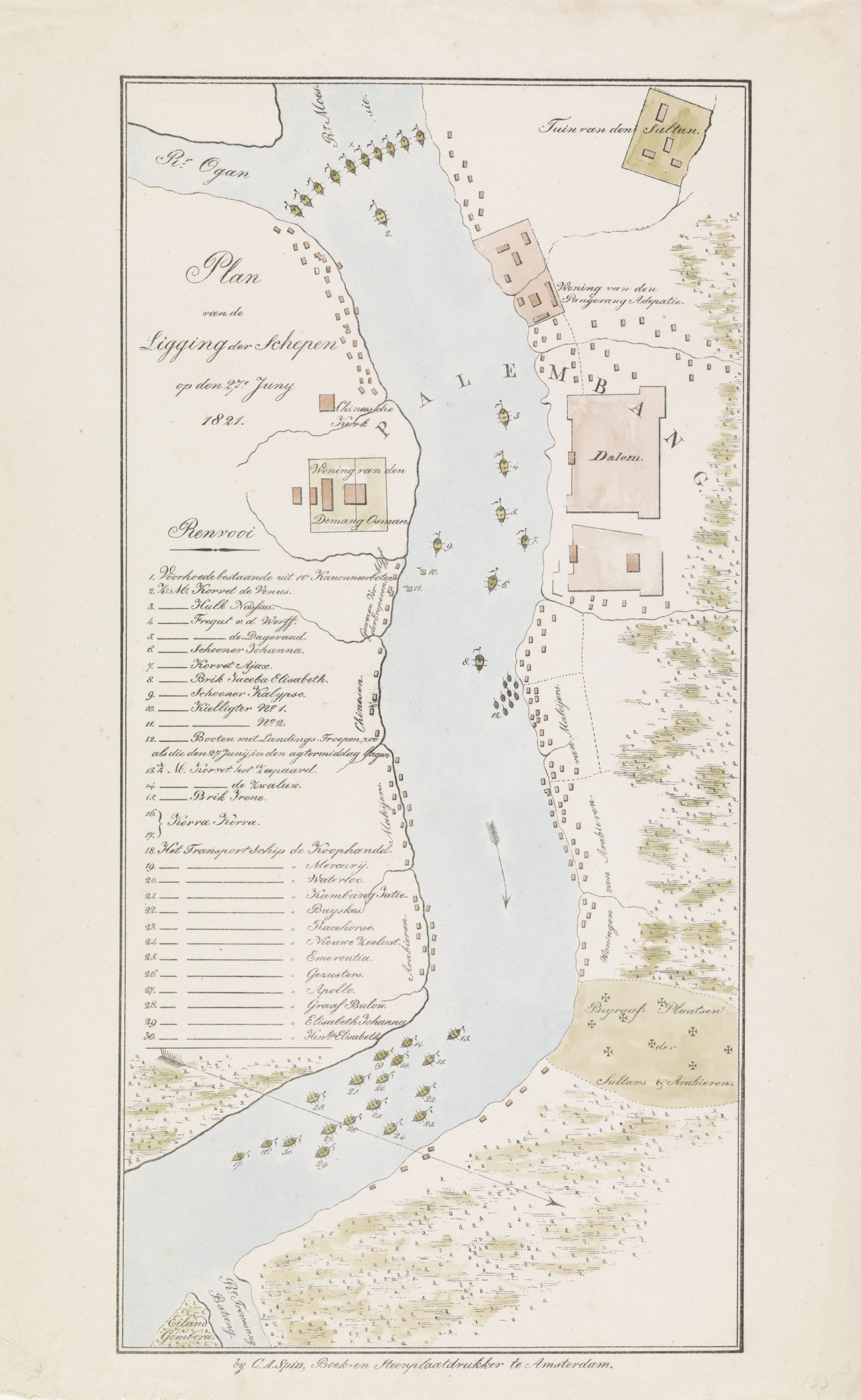
Map of Palembang and the Musi River, c. 1821.

Following the Palembang War of 1821 and the dissolution of the Sultanate on 7 October 1823, the Kuto Tengkuruk was demolished.

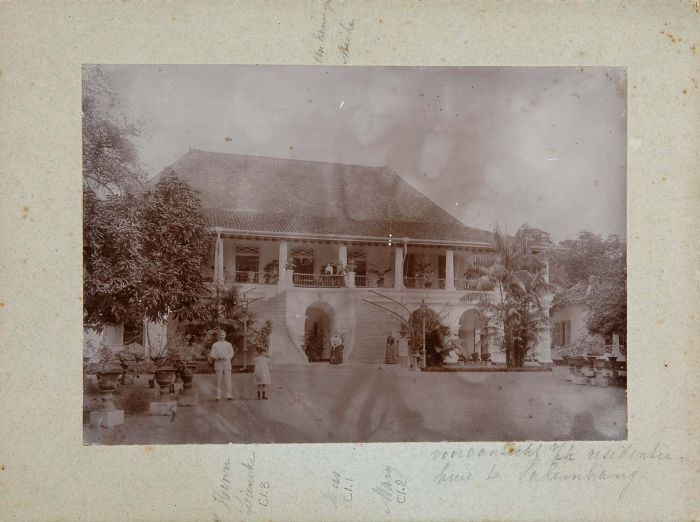
Palembang Residentiehuis, now Sultan Mahmud Badaruddin II Museum.

Following the deconstruction Kuto Tengkuruk, under the order of van Sevenhoven, a new building was constructed and was established as the residence of the Regeering Commissaris. The building is now Sultan Mahmud Badaruddin II Museum.

=== Conflicts Involved ===
The Sultanate of Palembang was involved in skirmishes with the Dutch Colonial Empire and the private joint-stock companies such as the Dutch East India Company. After losing control of Palembang following a series of skirmishes and ambushes with Sultanate forces, the Dutch gave way briefly to the British installed government of Indonesia.

Specific Conflicts include the 1811 attack on a Dutch Fort garrison off the cost of the Musi River led by Sultanate forces. There was an investigation carried out by Dutch officials to determine whether British official Thomas Stamford Raffles coordinated with Sultan Mahmud Badaruddin II to conduct the operation. Results found copies letters between Raffles and Sultan Mahmud Badaruddin II but without unquestionable evidence.

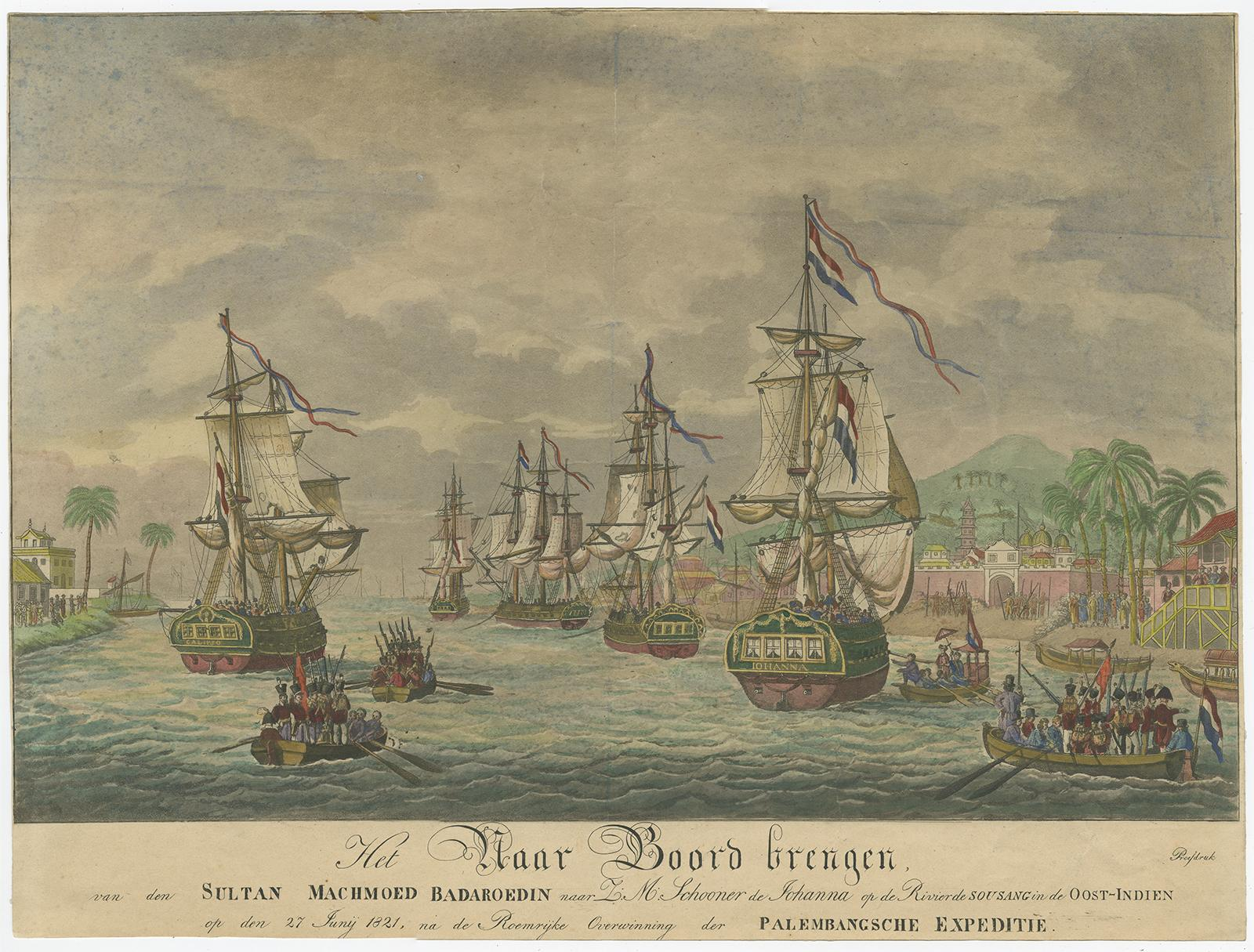
A depiction of the naval Battle of Palembang before Dutch Colonial forces land. Made by J.A. Lutz 1822–1823.

The First Expedition to Palembang in 1819 resulted in the defeat of Dutch forces invading Palembang in 1819. Leaders of the conflict included Constantijn Johan Wolterbeek and Sultan Mahmud Badaruddin II. Accounts from Johan Wolterbeek mention that the heavily fortified coasts of the rivers of Palembang prevented Naval assault, thus halting the expedition. Neither side of the conflict obtained casualties in direct relation to combat on either side.

The Second Expedition to Palembang in 1821 resulted in the defeat of the Sultanate of Palembang defending against Dutch forces. Leaders of the conflict included Hendrik Merkus de Kock and Sultan Mahmud Badaruddin II. In collaboration with information gathered by Wolterbeek, the Second Expedition was successful. The political result would be the transfer of power from the Sultanate to the Dutch Colonial Government and in 1823, the dissolvement of the Sultanate in total.

Dutch rule would last from June 1821 to December 27, 1949.

=== Policy changes resulting in the end of the Palembang War ===
Sultan Mahmud Badaruddin II would be removed from his position by Dutch authority and replaced by his son, Sultan Ahmad Najamuddin III, who would maintain slight political power for 4 years until his status as Sultan was revoked by Dutch officials after he had attempted to escape to the Bengkulu region. In 1821 the Dutch implemented a Bureaucracy with an appointed governor and regional heads of authority to manage assigned districts of the area. They were considered a higher power than of that of the Sultan. Islamic religious courts were not altered.

When the Sultanate was abolished, so was the allowance given to Palembang nobles by the Dutch government. Regional control and influence of the Sultanate and its officials would decrease over time and be directly influenced by Dutch decisions and policy. Ports were to be opened and improved to promote trade to other countries as the Sumatra region hosted a center for peppers. There would be an increase to the immigration as a result, primarily Chinese and Arab merchants. The Dutch oil company Shell moved into Palembang in 1904 to begin production.

=== Today ===
Currently, there are two separate claimants to the sultanate, each running their own courts.

In 2003, the Palembang Sultanate Custom Community Council (Indonesian: Majelis Adat Kesultanan Palembang Darussalam) recognized Raden Haji Muhammad Syafei Prabu Diradja, a retired police officer, as a descendant of Sultan Mahmud Badaruddin II and proceeded to elect him as Sultan Mahmud Badaruddin III. The coronation took place in Lawang Kidul Mosque, near the tomb of Sultan Mahmud Badaruddin I (reigned 1724–1756). The elderly Mahmud Badaruddin III later died on 8 September 2017, and was succeeded by his youngest son and heir apparent Raden Muhammad Fauwaz Diradja, who reigned as Mahmud Badaruddin IV.

In 2006, Haji Raden Mahmud Badaruddin, chairman of Palembang Sultanate Lineage Association (Indonesian: Himpunan Zuriat Kesultanan Palembang Darussalam), was crowned Sultan Iskandar Mahmud Badaruddin following an adat deliberation. He is a direct male-line descendant of Prince Purboyo, son of Sultan Muhammad Mansyur, and the daughter of Mahmud Badaruddin I. The Palembang Sultanate was formally abolished in 1825, the sultans hold no authority beyond cultural and customary duties.

== Lists of Sultans of Palembang ==
=== Sultanate of Palembang Darussalam (1659–1823) ===
- Sri Susuhunan Abdurrahman (1659–1706), founder of the Sultanate, brother of Prince Sedo ing Rajek, the previous ruler of Palembang
- Sultan Muhammad Mansyur Jayo Ing Lago (1706–1718), son of Abdurrahman
- Sultan Agung Komaruddin Sri Teruno (1718–1724), son of Abdurrahman
- Sultan Mahmud Badaruddin I Jayo Wikramo (1724–1757), son of Muhammad Mansyur
- Sultan Anom Alimuddin (1724–1727), jointly ruled with his half-brother Mahmud Badaruddin I until was driven out
- Sultan Ahmad Najamuddin I Adi Kusumo (1757–1776), son of Mahmud Badaruddin I
- Sultan Muhammad Bahauddin (1776–1803), son of Ahmad Najamuddin I
- Sultan Mahmud Badaruddin II (1803–1812, 1813, 1817–1821), son of Muhammad Bahauddin
- Sultan Ahmad Najamuddin II (1812–1813, 1813–1817, 1821–1823), son of Muhammad Bahauddin
- Sultan Ahmad Najamuddin III (1819–1821), son of Mahmud Badaruddin II
- Sultan Ahmad Najamuddin IV Prabu Anom (1821–1823), son of Ahmad Najamuddin II

=== Descendants of Mahmud Badaruddin II (2003 – present day) ===
- Sultan Mahmud Badaruddin III Prabu Diradja Al-Hajj (2003–2017)
- Sultan Mahmud Badaruddin IV Djaya Wikrama (2017–now)

=== Family Tree ===
Family Tree of Palembang Sultans

Abdurrahman^{(1)} r. 1659–1704
Muhammad; Mansyur^{(2)} r. 1704-1709	Agung; Komaruddin^{(3)} r. 1714-1724
Mahmud; Badaruddin I^{(4)} r. 1724-1758
Ahmad; Najamuddin I^{(5)} r. 1758-1776
Muhammad; Bahauddin^{(6)} r. 1776-1804
Mahmud; Badaruddin II^{(7)} r. 1804-1812, 1813, 1818-1821	Ahmad; Najamuddin II^{(8)} r. 1813-1818
Ahmad; Najamuddin III^{(9)} r. 1819-1821	Ahmad; Najamuddin IV^{(10)} r. 1821-1823

== Gallery ==
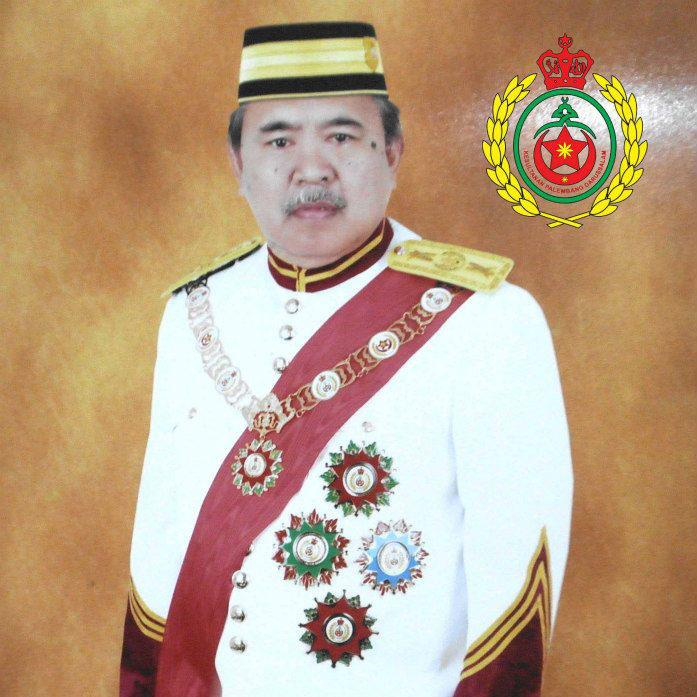
Sultan Mahmud Badaruddin III (2003–2017)

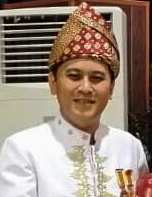
Sultan Mahmud Badaruddin IV (2017–now)

== See also ==
- Palembangese people

== Cited works ==
- Berg, C.C. (1985). Penulisan Sejarah Jawa. Jakarta: Bhratara.
- Kartodirdjo, Sartono; Poesponegoro, Marwati Djoened; Notosusanto, Nugroho (1975). Sejarah nasional Indonesia: Jaman pertumbuhan dan perkembangan kerajaan-kerajaan Islam di Indonesia. Departemen Pendidikan dan Kebudayaan.
