= Mahmud Badaruddin II =

Sultan of Palembang Sultanate

Sultan Mahmud Badaruddin Pangeran Ratu

7th and 8th Sultan of Palembang first period
- Reign: 12 April 1804 – 14 May 1812
- Predecessor: Sultan Muhammad Bahauddin
- Successor: Position abolished by the EIC

Second period
- Reign: 13 July 1813 - August 1813
- Predecessor: Sultan Ahmad Najamuddin II (reinstated by the EIC)
- Successor: Monarchy Abolished

Third period
- Reign: 7 June 1818 – 1 July 1821
- Predecessor: Reinstated by Herman Muntinghe
- Successor: Position Abolished

Susuhunan of Palembang
- Reign: December 1819 - 1 July 1821
- Successor: Sultan Ahmad Najamuddin III
- Born: 23 November 1767; Palembang, Palembang Sultanate
- Died: 26 November 1852 (aged 85); Ternate, Dutch East Indies
- Issue: Sultan Ahmad Nadjamuddin III
Names
- Pangeran Ratu Mahmud Badaruddin bin Sultan Muhammad Bahauddin
- House: Azmatkhan
- Father: Sultan Muhammad Bahauddin
- Mother: Ratu Agung Al-Haddad Binti Datuk Murni Al-Haddad

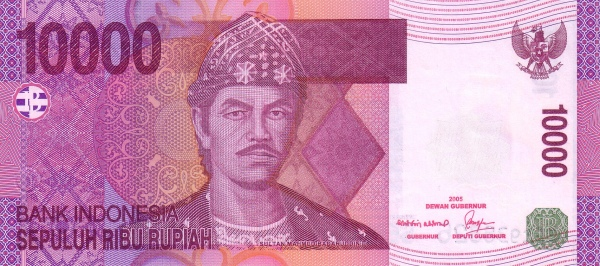
Sultan Mahmud Badarudin II featured in the 10,000-rupiah banknote.

Sultan Mahmud Badaruddin II (1767–1852) was the 7th and 8th Sultan of the Palembang Sultanate from 1804–1821. His parents were Sultan Muhammad Bahauddin and Ratu Agung Al-Haddad. He is now regarded as a National Hero of Indonesia. He was featured in the original 2005-issue and modified 2010-issue Rp10,000 banknotes.

== See also ==
- Masagus
