= Anthing =

Anthing is a surname. Notable people with the surname include:

- Carl Heinrich Wilhelm Anthing (1766–1823), German officer in the Dutch army
- F. L. Anthing (1820–1883), Dutch evangelist in Java
- Johann Friedrich Anthing (1753–1805), German serviceman, artist, and historian
