= Indies Brigade =

Military unit in the Napoleonic Wars

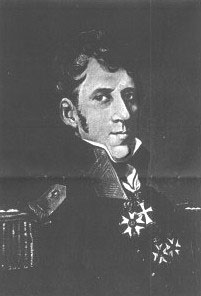
The unit was commanded by Baron Lieutenant General Carl Heinrich Wilhelm Anthing

The Indies Brigade or Indian Brigade (Dutch: Indische Brigade or Indiaansche Brigade), also referred to as the Dutch Indies Brigade or Netherlands Indies Brigade, was a Dutch-Belgian military unit which took part in the Waterloo Campaign and subsequent invasion of France in 1815. It was sent to the Dutch East Indies together with the Commissioners-General of the Dutch East Indies after the Hundred Days to fulfil its mission as the core of the future Royal Netherlands Indies Army in October 1815.

The brigade was composed of some 3,500 men recruited to garrison the Dutch colonies in the West Indies (Suriname and the Netherlands Antilles) and in the Dutch East Indies.

In the Waterloo Campaign, the Brigade was part of the 1st Dutch-Belgian division (Lt. Gen. Stedman and (nominally) Prince Frederick of the Netherlands). The unit was under the command of Lieutenant-General Baron Carl Heinrich Wilhelm Anthing, a German officer in Dutch service, and consisted of:

- 5th East Indies Regiment (Oost-Indisch regiment No. 5) under G.M. Busman, consisting of two battalions
- 10th West Indies Jäger Battalion (Bataljon West-Indische jagers No. 10) under H.W. Rancke
- 11th West Indies Jäger Battalion (Bataljon West-Indische jagers No. 11) under Frederik Knotzer
- Light battalion (Bataljon flankeurs) under Willem Schenck
- a battery of foot artillery with six 6-pounder guns and two 5.5 in howitzers
- a baggage train

== History ==
After the formation of the United Kingdom of the Netherlands and the Anglo-Dutch Treaty of 1814, by which the British relinquished control of the Dutch colonies, King William I of the Netherlands acted to recruit troops to safeguard his colonial possessions. However, soon after, Napoleon escaped from exile on Elba and in June 1815 launched the Waterloo Campaign. The Dutch scrambled their troops to defend against the French invasion, and the troops bound for the colonies were combined into a temporary Indies Brigade and placed under Baron Lieutenant General Carl Heinrich Wilhelm Anthing, commander of the Dutch East Indies force.

During the Waterloo Campaign, the brigade formed part of II Corps under the British general Lord Hill. The unit was held in reserve and did not take part in either the Battle of Waterloo or the Battle of Quatre Bras. Allied commander-in-chief Arthur Wellesley, 1st Duke of Wellington positioned the brigade with the 1st Netherlands Division near the town of Halle. These Dutch-Belgian units, nominally under the command of then 18-year-old Prince Frederick of the Netherlands, were joined on the morning of 18 June by British and Hanoverian units. The troops, 17,000 in all, were placed around Halle to protect the Allied right (Western) flank from French attack, and instructed to hold their ground if attacked. However, they remained in reserve and did not take part in the fighting.

In the Allied invasion of France following the victory at Waterloo, the Indies Brigade took part in the assaults on Le Quesnoy, Valenciennes and Condé-sur-l'Escaut. The unit's commander, major-general Anthing, negotiated the French surrender of Le Quesnoy.

On the 15th of August, the brigade departed France for the Netherlands. Upon return, the unit was separated from the Dutch mobile army on the 6th of September so that the brigade could prepare to leave for the colonies. On the 29th of October the first of the troops from the Indies Brigade left the Netherlands, sailing for the Dutch East Indies from Texel aboard a Dutch navy squadron under command of the member of the Commissarissen Generaal, Rear-Admiral Buyskes, consisting of Zr. Ms. Admiraal Evertsen (flagship), Zr. Ms. Admiraal De Ruyter, Zr. Ms. Amsterdam, Zr. Ms. Braband, Zr. Ms. Maria van Reigersbergen, Zr. Ms. Iris, and Zr. Ms. Spion. On board of the De Ruyter were Commissioners-General Buyskes and Elout, the botanist Caspar Georg Carl Reinwardt, and about 600 soldiers of the Indies Brigade who had been at the Battle of Waterloo, but now came to fulfill the original task of the brigade: defending the Dutch East Indies, under command of lt-general Anthing; another 1200 were spread over the remaining ships. The squadron arrived on the roadstead of Batavia on 21 May 1816.

The passage had been far from smooth and 48 people on the De Ruyter did not survive the voyage, while 116 people were seriously ill on arrival. Anthing was no longer aboard, as he had left the ship with a number of his troops at a stop in the bay of Benkoelen. He had there bought a small ship with his own money and set off to finish the voyage in this way, as he had found the voyage on the De Ruyter to be "intolerable". They arrived at Anjer and continued over land to Batavia, arriving on 10 June 1816.

The Brigade remained in an encampment at Meester Cornelis until the formal handover of power by the British Lieutenant-Governor to the Commissioners-General on 19 August 1816. On 2 September, Anthing went on his first inspection tour of Java after which, having returned to Batavia, he submitted a report, dated 23 October, on the state of the forts on Java and Madura. Lack of tact on his part, in connection with his right to be answerable only to acting Governor-General Godert van der Capellen directly caused difficulties and frictions to arise in his relationship with the supreme authority. Though troops of the Indies Brigade took part in the suppression of the insurrection at Ambon and Saparua in the second half of 1817, Anthing was not personally involved in that campaign. The campaign ended with the execution of the "ring leaders" in December 1817. The Brigade, now evolving to the core of the Royal Netherlands East Indies Army, played a large part (together with indigenous auxiliary troops) in a number of armed conflicts with indigenous rulers in later years, like the First expedition to Palembang (1819), Second expedition to Palembang (1821), Padri War (1821–1837), Expedition to the West Coast of Borneo (1823), First Bone War (1824–1825), and especially the Java War with Prince Diponegoro that started in 1825.
