= St. Servatius Church =

Church in Indonesia

- Indonesian: Gereja Santo Servatius
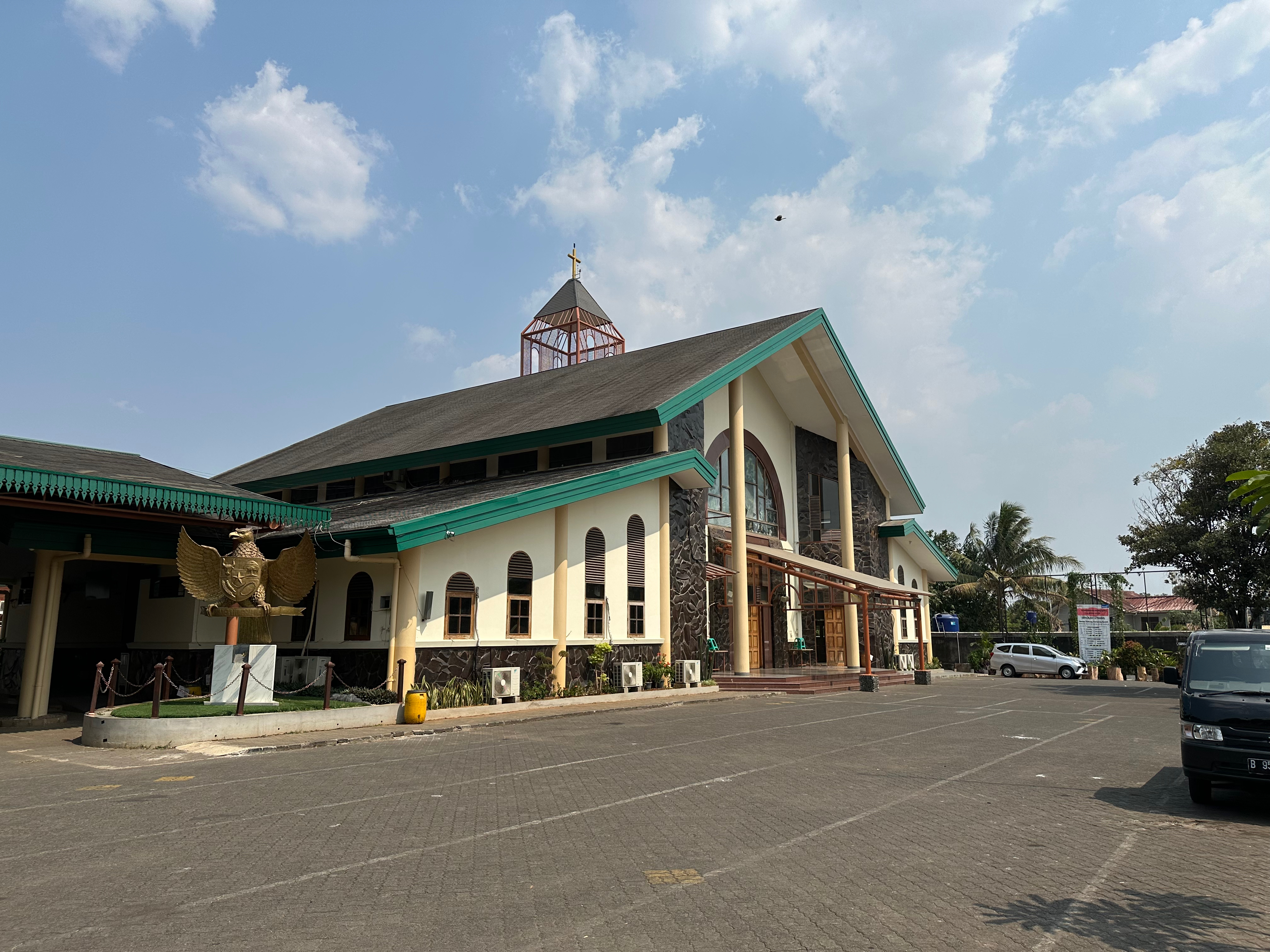
- St. Servatius Church
- Location: Jl. Raya Kampung Sawah No.75 Bekasi 17113
- Country: Indonesia
- Denomination: Roman Catholic
- Website: servatius.id

History
- Status: Church

Architecture
- Functional status: Active
- Style: Betawi architecture

Administration
- Diocese: Roman Catholic Archdiocese of Jakarta

The Catholic Church of St. Servatius (Indonesian: Gereja Katolik Santo Servatius) in Kampung Sawah, Bekasi, West Java is a parish consisting of mostly Catholic Christians from Betawi community in the Kampung Sawah area. Betawi culture is still shown by church members through the use of Betawi language and vocabulary which is derived from the Malay language. In Kampung Sawah itself the Betawi culture has survived even though some parts of it have become extinct. One of the Betawi cultural rituals that have survived, although undergoing changes, is bebaritan or what is currently known as the sedekah bumi or earth's Almsgiving. Uniquely, this ritual is currently carried out at the Parish of Santo Servatius Kampung Sawah.

== History ==
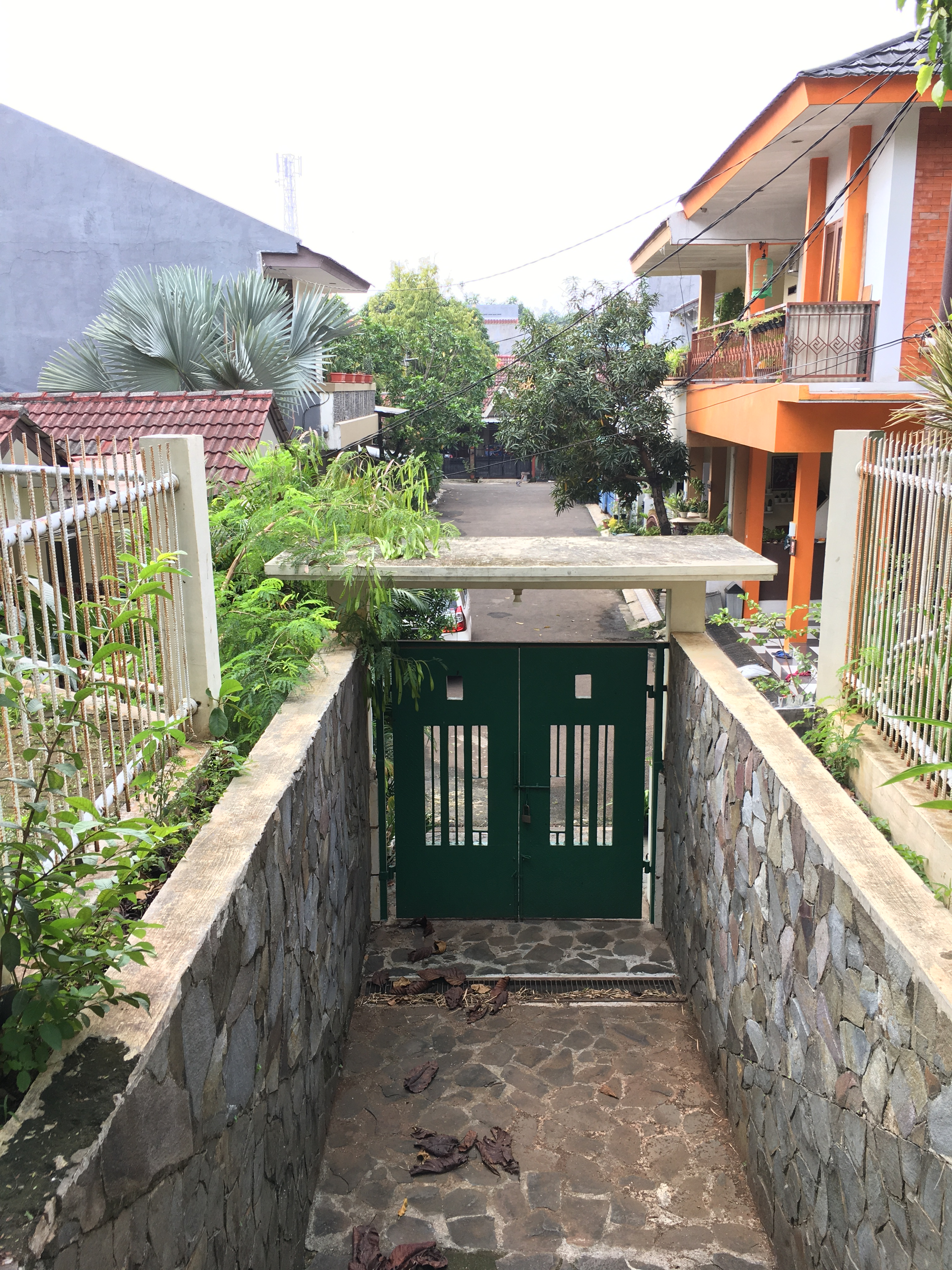
Kampung Sawah from the churchyard

At the end of the 19th century, most of the residents of Kampung Sawah had embraced Islam. Even so, they still often do animist rituals, especially when they enter places that are considered haunted. The area of Kampung Sawah at that time was still like a dark jungle. The majority of the inhabitants are Betawi people who speak Malay and consist of a mixture of various cultures and descendants.

The blend between Betawi culture and Christianity actually occurred before the entry of Catholics to Kampung Sawah. F. L. Anthing was the first Protestant to successfully enter Betawi culture. He succeeded in establishing a congregation in Kampung Sawah and succeeded in combining cultural rites with Christianity that emphasized ngelmu and other mystical things. Unfortunately this was considered syncretism and the practices began to fade over time. Currently there are still some members of the congregation who use the Our Father's prayer in the Betawi language to protect them in haunted places.

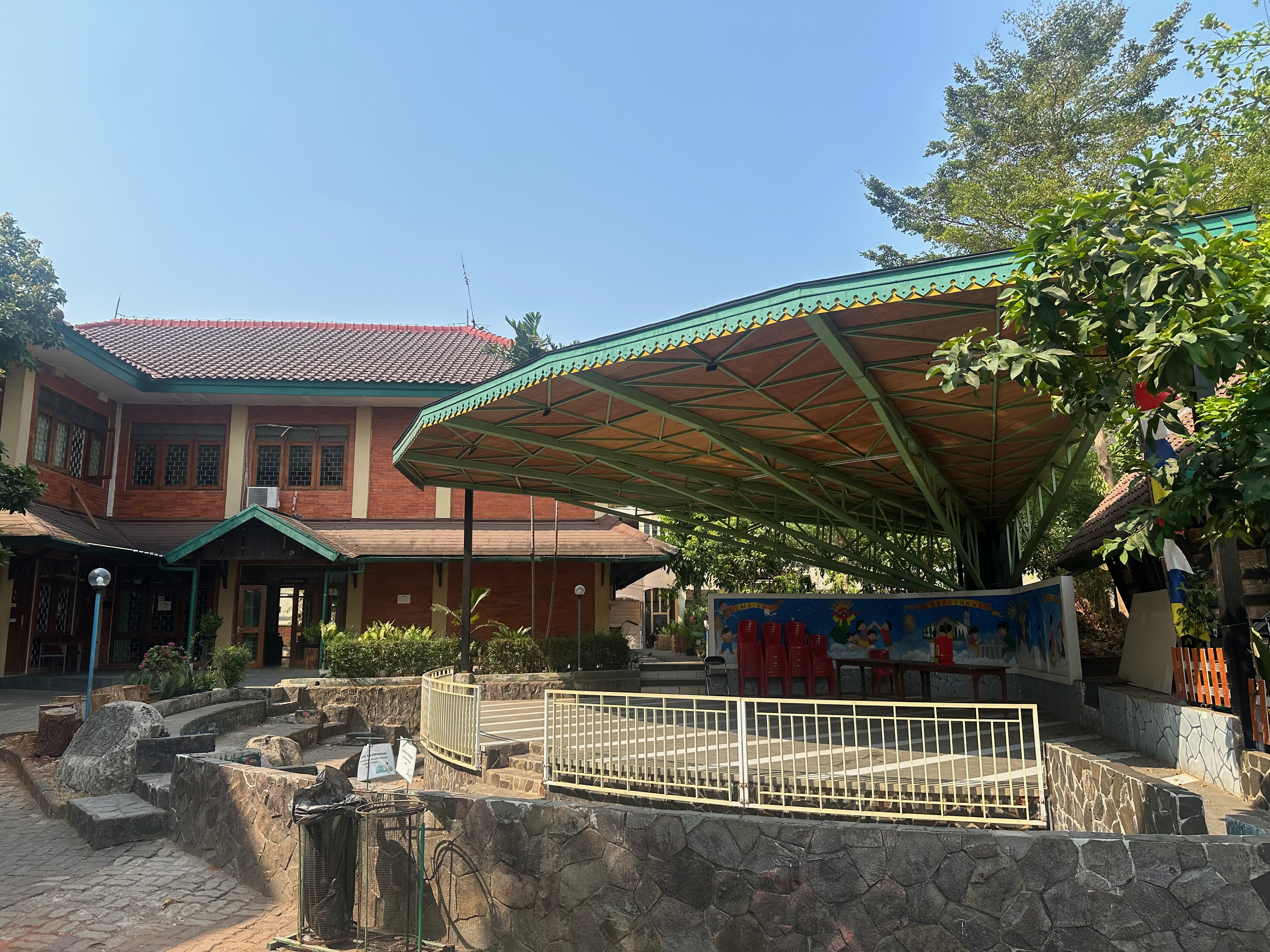
Church yard and its theater

Parish of Santo Servatius Kampung Sawah itself is a splinter from the Kampung Sawah Protestant Church which was pioneered by F. L. Anthing. In 1895 the Kampung Sawah Protestant congregation split into three opposing factions. The first fraction is the Laban teacher group based in Kampung Sawah barat, the second faction is the Yoseh group which holds services in Kampung Sawah timur and the third faction is the Nathanael teacher group who chose Roman Catholicism to enter Kampung Sawah. Guru Nathanael himself did this after he was fired from his position as an assistant teacher at the Kampung Sawah Protestant Church. He then sought help from the Jakarta Cathedral church located in Banteng Square, Jakarta. October 6 is considered to be the birthday of the Kampung Sawah Catholics (the initial name for the Parish of Santo Servatius Kampung Sawah) after Pastor Schweitz baptized 18 children in Kampung Sawah.

== History of Ritual Bebaritan into Earth Alms ==
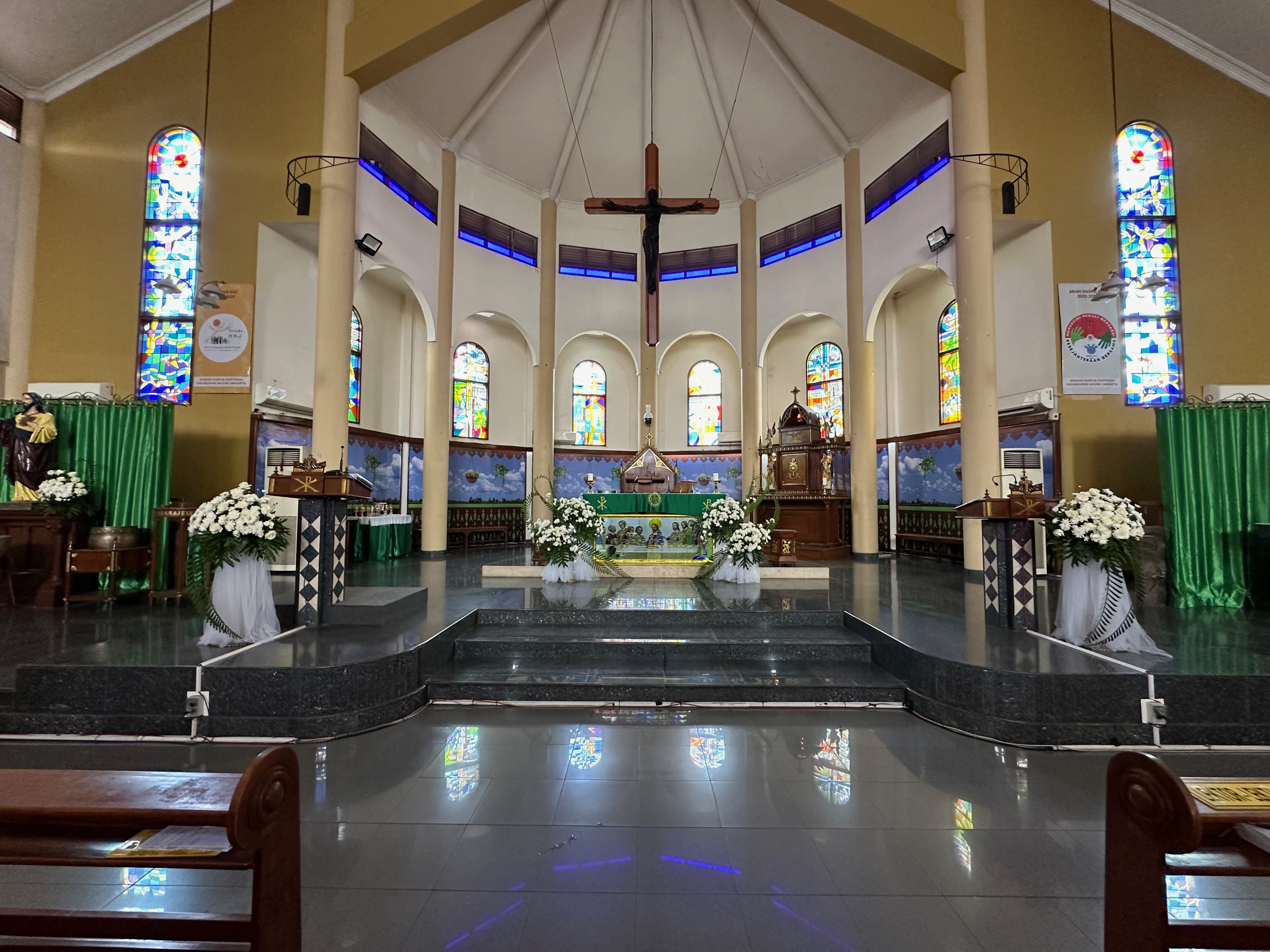
Altar

Bebaritan is an animist ritual performed by residents of Kampung Sawah to beg for safety to denghaeng, dedemit, or watchmen from an area considered haunted. All residents bring food processed from their respective crops and gather in the haunted place. All the food that has been brought by each resident is mixed and arranged on a wide banana leaf as a base. The residents then took their places and lined up parallel to the food they had prepared. Then the leader of the ritual reads the chants (incantations) from the end of the line. After the chanting reading, all the residents ate the food they had arranged on the banana leaves earlier. Expressions of gratitude for residents through chanting and eating together are usually filled with traditional Betawi dances and music.

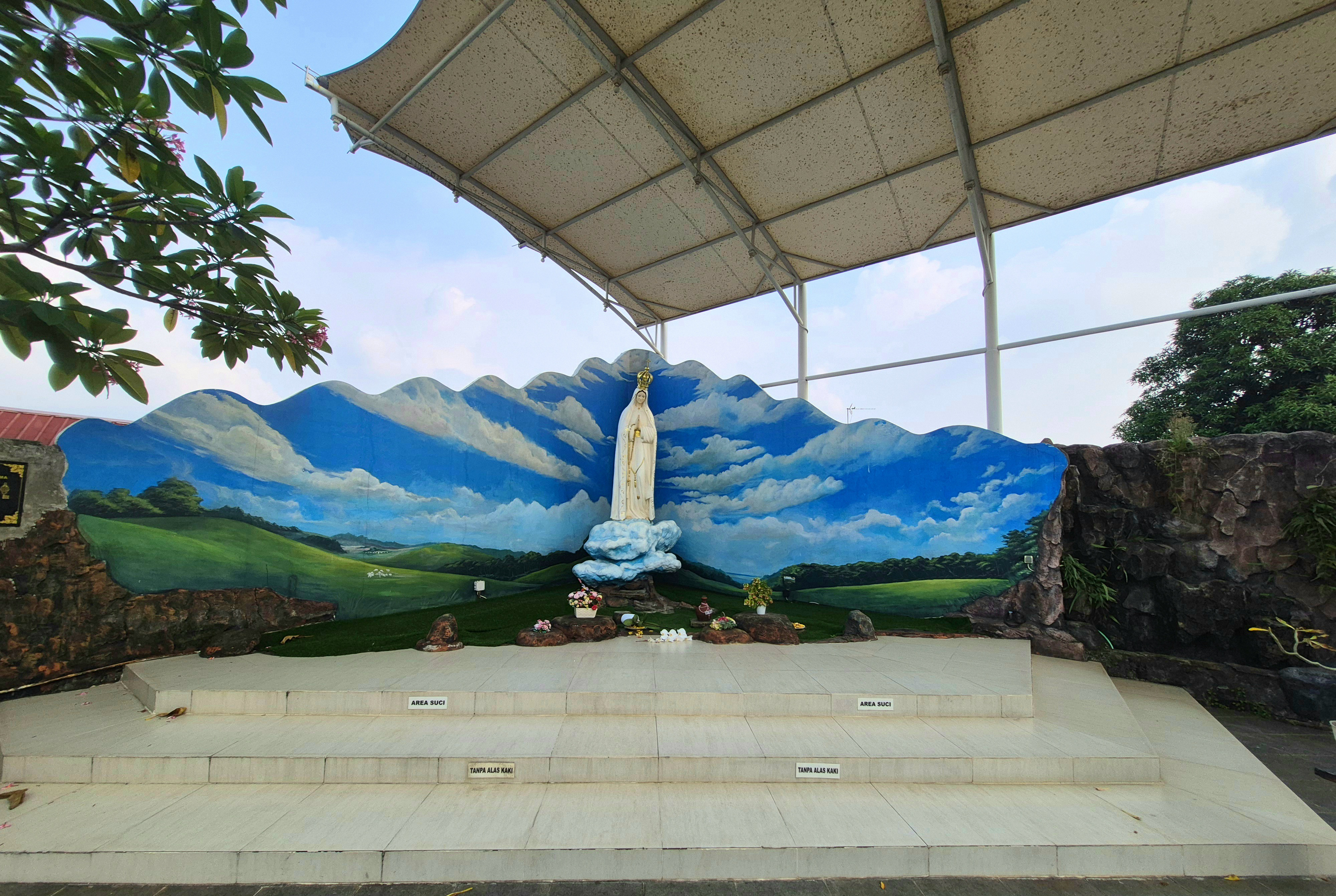
Saung Maria (Marian grotto) of the church

Currently, the ritual of bebaritan in its original form no longer exists. The last bebaritan ritual was carried out in 1963/1964 and was carried out in a more modern form, namely with Dangdutan. In 1936, for the first time, an earth alms ceremony was held among members of the Parish of Santo Servatius Kampung Sawah. At that time, Pastor Oscar Cremers blessed the rice harvest as a form of gratitude from the residents of Kampung Sawah. This incident became the forerunner of the earth alms ritual in St. Servatius Parish. The earth alms ritual has been held every May 13.

At that time the ritual was carried out simply, namely the blessing of the harvest and the sharing of a portion of the harvest to the penderep. Penderep are people who help rice field owners to reap their crops. The ritual is then also carried out in the form of giving offerings from church members who are present when the eucharist is held. The members of St. Servatius Parish hand overproduce in the form of coconut, durian, jackfruit, rambutan, cassava, rice, and so on at church mass.

== Inculturation of Betawi Culture ==
128th-anniversary party of the church

On May 13, 1996, the anniversary of Saint Servatius Church, a total of six Betawi men and six women were appointed as members of Saint Servatius kinship. The kinship of Saint Servatius is a form of reviving an ancient tradition in the Catholic church that expresses the faith of its members through outward forms for spiritual values (such as a fraternity or conferia). The kinship aims to serve and promote devotion to Saint Servatius whose relics will be placed in the church. They also wear various attributes of typical Betawi clothing, such as blackcap, black komprang pants, white sadaria shirt, red sarong and machete for the men, while the women wear a white veil, batik sarong and white kebaya. The tanjidor music corps performed for the first time among the congregation members. The congregational singing was also composed according to the Betawi tune, which was mostly composed by Marsianus Balita. The ceremony closed with a group meal in the churchyard and at the Servas (short for Servatius) warung, which is located opposite the church. The inauguration was carried out in conjunction with the earth alms ritual which is a hallmark of the parish of Saint Servatius.

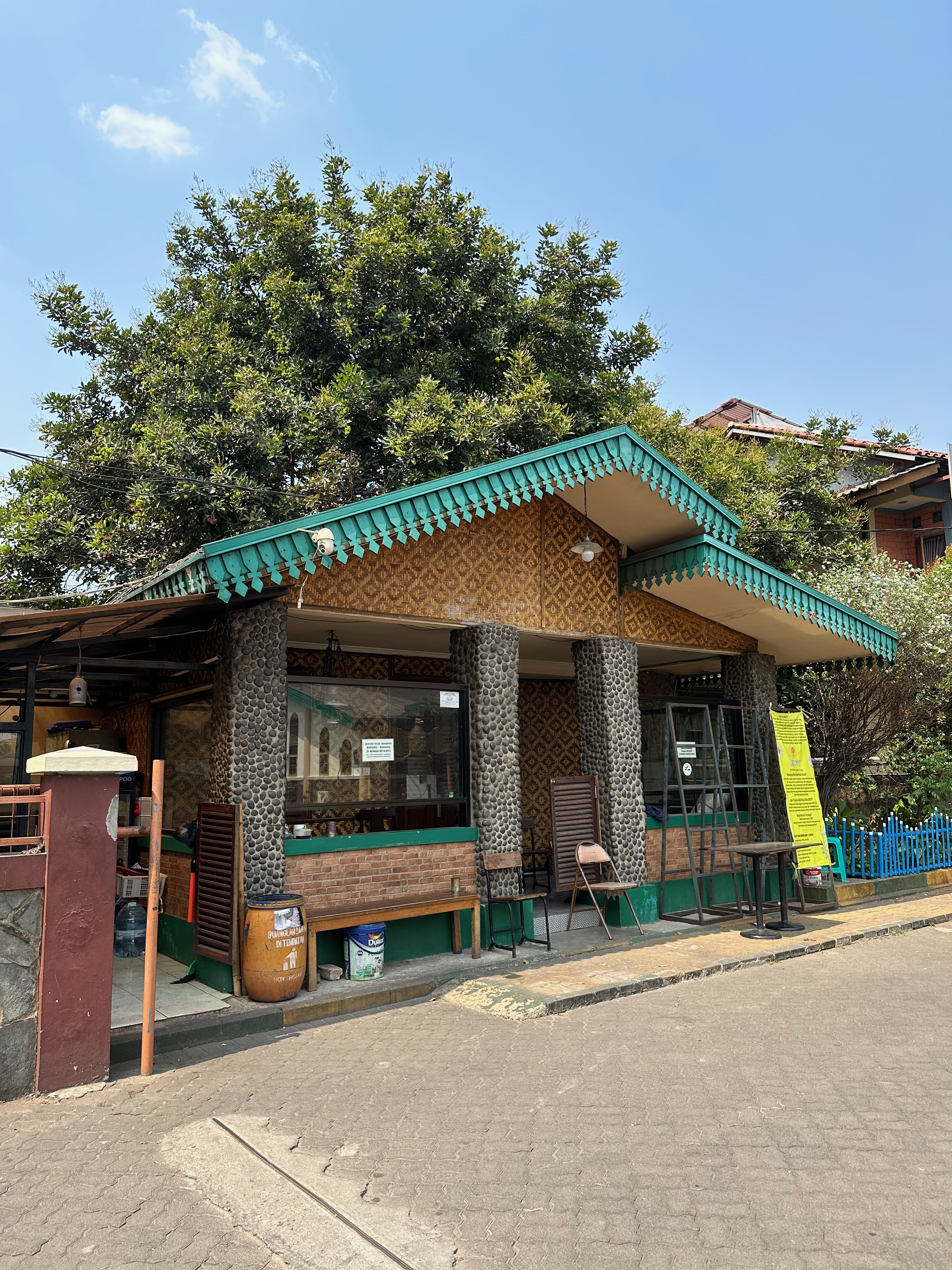
Rumah Betawi (Betawi house) where people can meet and discuss anything important.

At present, every May 13, the parish of Saint Servatius always holds an earth alms ritual and a people's feast that takes place during mass and after mass. In addition to sharing crops in the form of Kampung Sawah specialties such as abug cakes, boiled cassava, boiled peanuts, etc., the event was also enlivened by Benyamin Sueb songs. Apart from these events, the earth alms ritual also includes making dodol (stirring dodol). This dodol is processed early in the morning and is carried out for seven hours. The meaning of this dodol stirring activity cannot be separated from the conditions in the manufacturing process. The first requirement is a cultural requirement which is divided into two types, namely suggestion and control. The form of suggestion is by tapping the cauldron three times while submitting a request for the lunkhead to be finished within the specified time, but if it does not work according to the specified time, the dodol will be thrown away into the flowing river.

The form of control that is used during the manufacture of lunkhead is to keep the dough from becoming too runny. People who are allowed to taste kole (half-finished dodol) are the ones who are considered the oldest. The wood used for fuel is rambutan wood or coconut fronds because it doesn't cause a lot of ash. In addition, the fire used to cook the dodol dough must be kept small and not extinguished.

== Gallery ==
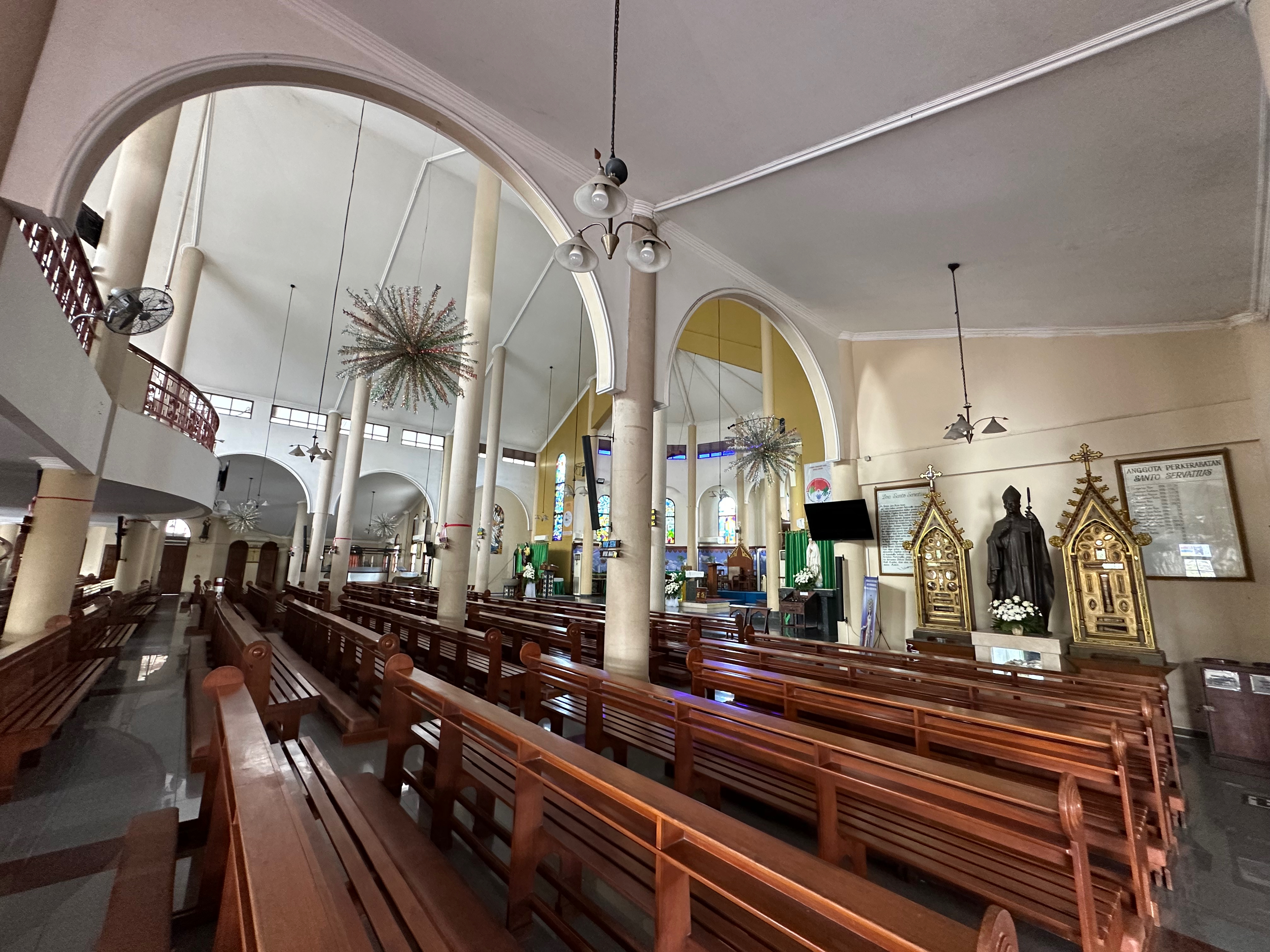
Interior of the church

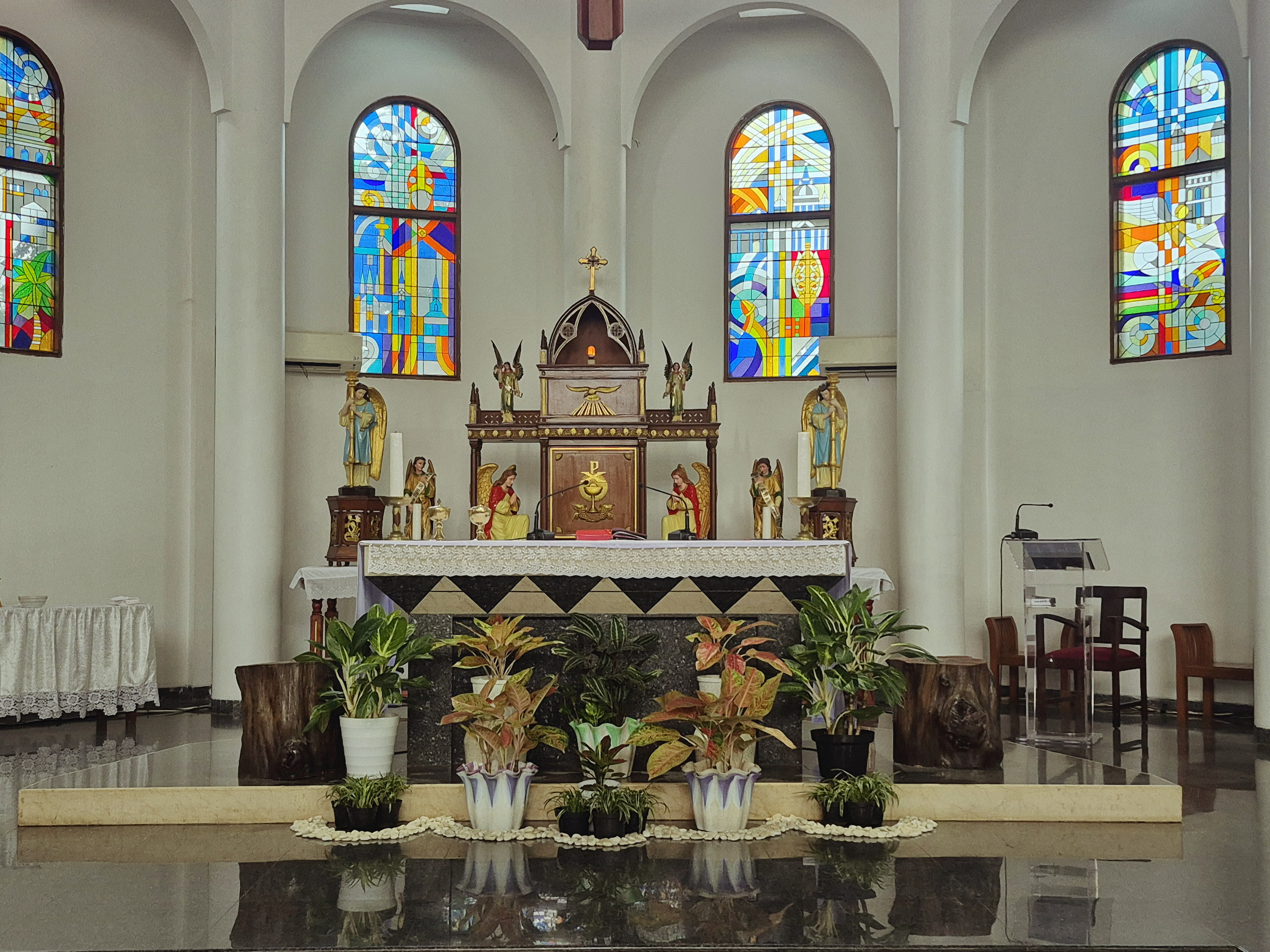
Detail of the altar

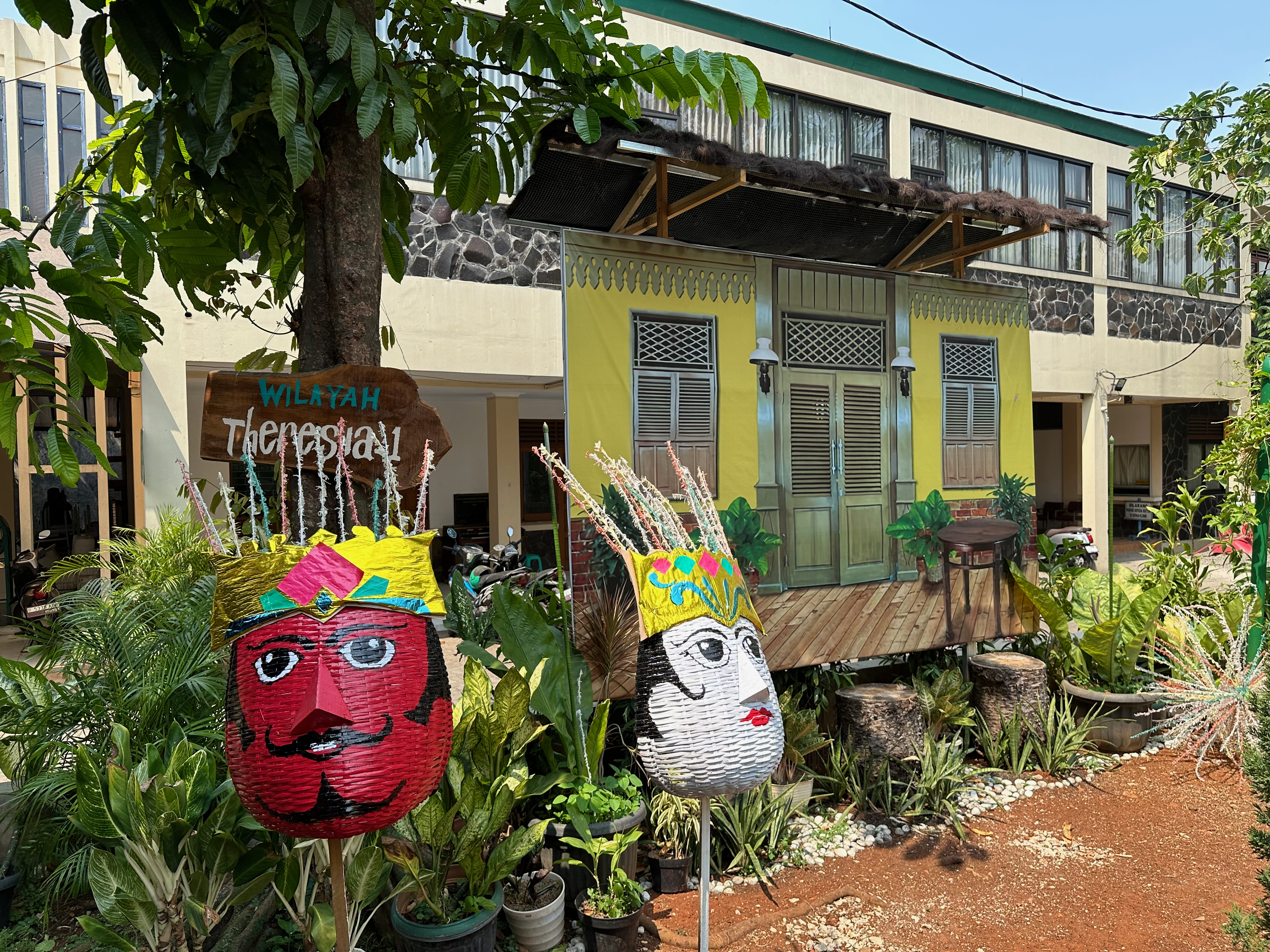
One of the church gardens

== See also ==
- Betawi people
- Christianity in Indonesia
