= Ibrahim Tunggul Wulung =

Indonesian evangelist

Ibrahim Tunggul Wulung (1800–1885) was an indigenous evangelist working in East Java, Central Java, West Java and Banten, Indonesia. He began to evangelize the Javanese people in the early 19th century. In that time, Christianity in Java generally was being developed by lay evangelists like F. L. Anthing, C. V. Stevens-Phillips from Netherlands and also supported by indigenous evangelist like Kyai Sadrach, Paul Tosari and Kiai Ibrahim Tunggul Wulung.
