= Carl Heinrich Wilhelm Anthing =

German officer in the Dutch Army (1766–1823)

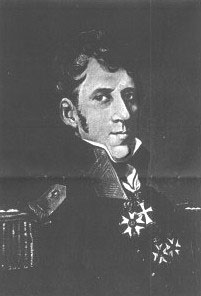
- Born: 11 November 1766; Saxe-Gotha
- Died: 7 February 1823 (aged 56); The Hague
- Military career
- Allegiance: (Netherlands) Dutch Republic; Batavian Republic; (Netherlands) Kingdom of Holland; First French Empire; United Kingdom of the Netherlands
- Branch: Infantry
- Service years: 1782–1818
- Rank: lieutenant-general
- Unit: Netherlands Army
- Commands: Indies Brigade
- Conflicts: War of the First Coalition; Flanders campaign; Anglo-Russian invasion of Holland; Battle of Krabbendam; Battle of Bergen (1799); Napoleonic Wars; War of the Second Coalition; War of the Third Coalition; Napoleon's planned invasion of the United Kingdom; War of the Fourth Coalition; War of the Fifth Coalition; Battle of Stralsund (1809); War of the Sixth Coalition; Battle of Lützen (1813); Battle of Bautzen (1813); Hundred Days; Battle of Waterloo; Reduction of the French fortresses in 1815
- Awards: Knight 3rd class Military William Order

Carl Heinrich Wilhelm Anthing (11 November 1766 in Saxe-Gotha – 7 February 1823 in The Hague) was a German officer, in Dutch service under several successive regimes, starting with the Dutch Republic, and followed by the Batavian Republic, the Kingdom of Holland, and the First French Empire, to end up in the United Kingdom of the Netherlands, where he led the Indies Brigade, both at Waterloo, and finally to the Dutch East Indies, where it would be the core of the future Royal Netherlands East Indies Army.

== Personal life ==
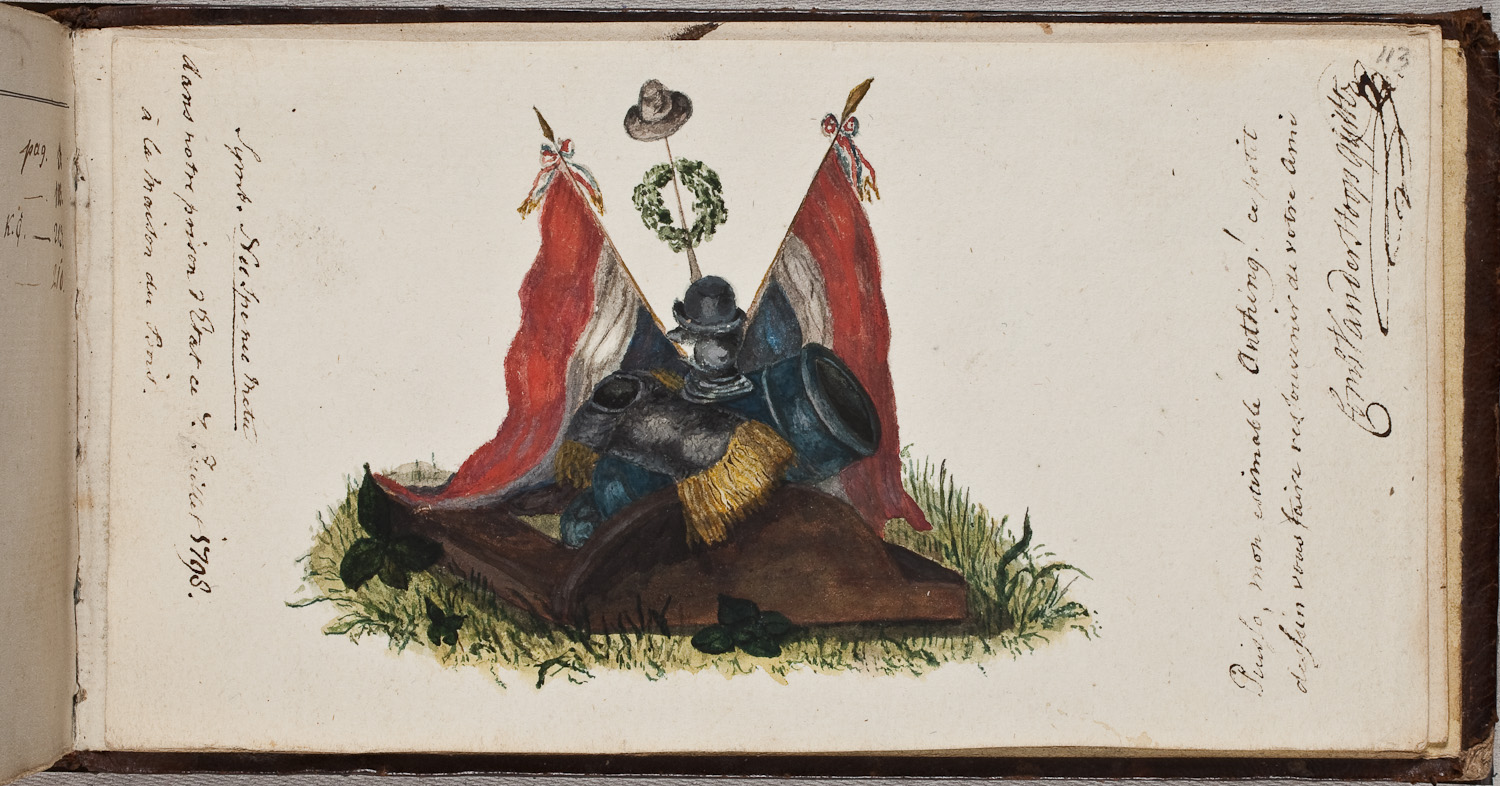
From the Album amicorum of Carl Heinrich Anthing with inscription by Cornelis van der Hoop 7 July 1798

Anthing was the son of Johann Philip Anthing and Dorothea Emilia Schierschmldt. He married Anna Maria Brascamp (1768-1802), from which marriage on 31 August 1792 in Willemstad a daughter, Dorothea Amalia Jeannette (1791), and a son, Johan Philip (1792), were born. After her death in 1802 he married Johanna Amalia Sophie baroness von Lettow (1783-1848).

== Career ==
Having entered service in Saxony at the age of 16 as a cadet and fahnjuncker, he came to the Dutch Republic in October 1786, assigned to the regiment Saksen-Gotha, which, according to the capitulation of the duke of that duchy, was in the service of the States General of the Netherlands. (Note: The Dutch States Army was a force of mostly mercenaries. And the sovereign which they served was not the stadtholder (who was the commander-in-chief), but the States General.) As an ensign with the 1st battalion of this regiment he attended the siege of Willemstad in 1793. In 1795 he was with the garrison of Heusden, when that fortress was surrendered to Herman Daendels on 13 January. After the revolution he joined the newly reorganized army (Note: The States Army was reorganized to an army on the French model with half-brigades as the main organizational units. The Dutch troops that had fought on the side of the French under Daendels and Dumonceau were integrated with it. But many mercenaries stayed with it.) (8 July 1795) in Batavian service as captain in the 3rd batalion of the 7th half-brigade. In 1798 he was promoted to major, and became deputy commander (Note: The name of the function was plaats-majoor, which means "deputy" of the commander of a military garrison, who is a groot-majoor.) with the titular rank of lieutenant colonel, of the garrison of The Hague, which position he exchanged on 25 April 1799 for that of commander of the 2nd battalion of the 6th half-brigade. At the head of this battalion he participated in the campaign in North Holland in 1799 against the landed British and Russians. During the attack of the French-Batavian army on the Zijpe (10 September), confusion arose in his battalion, close to Krabbendam, as a result of the impact of a grenade, which turned into panic through malicious shouting of "retreat", causing much of the battalion to flee. The example was contagious to other troops, so that the initial success achieved at this point in time was completely lost. The greater part of the battalion's officers were court-martialed, but acquitted when the inquiry showed that they had made their best efforts to stem the confusion and stop the retreat.

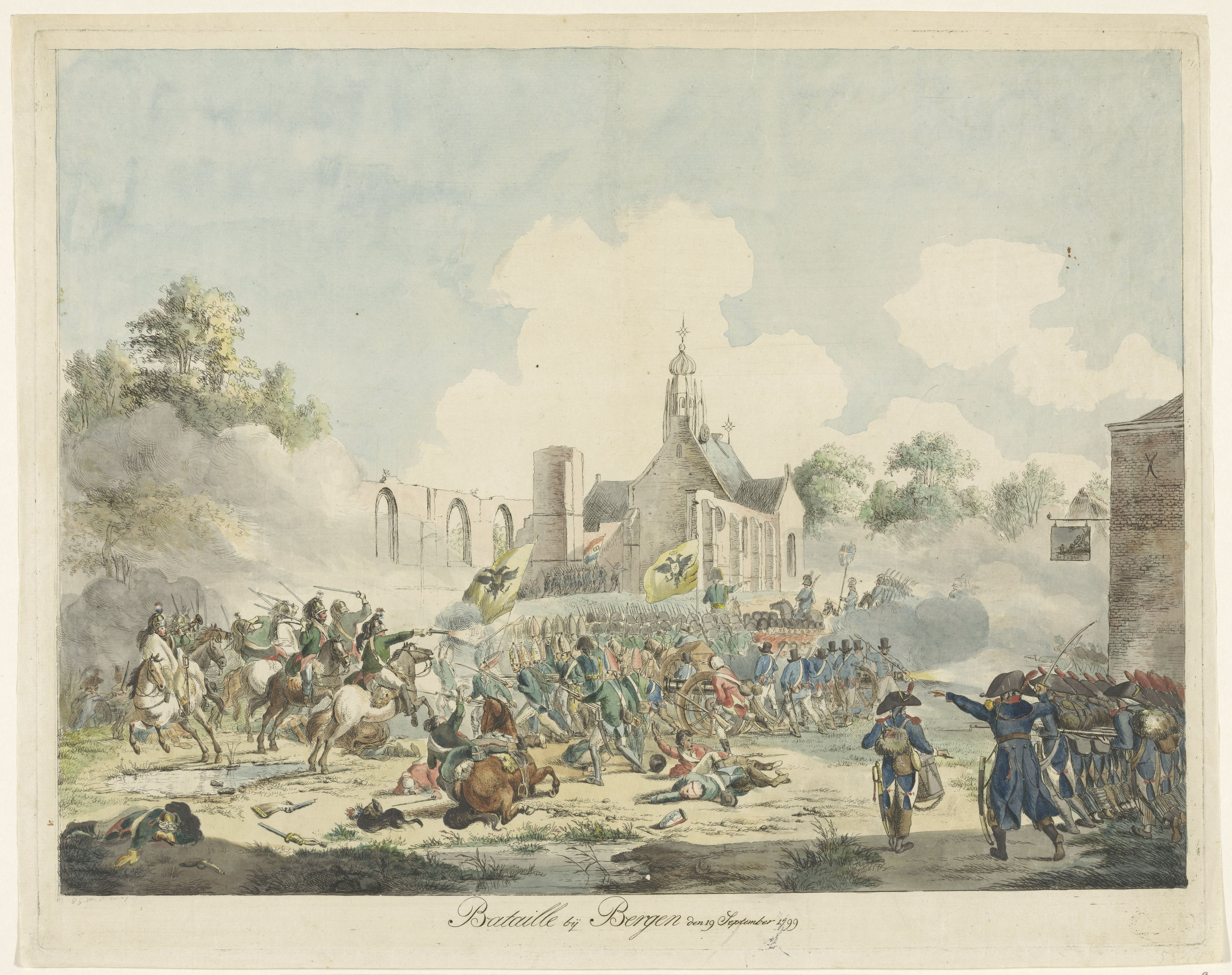
Battle of Bergen 1799

Had Anthing's battalion proved less reliable in this moment of weakness, it restored its reputation brilliantly in the battle of Bergen shortly afterwards, on 19 September, when, preceded by its commander, it passed over the bridge at Schoorldam, and, with heavy loss, forced the British defenders to give way.

According to his service record, Anthing took part in the winter campaign on the Main in 1800 with the Batavian division under Dumonceau. In 1801 he was stationed with the reserve army in Hanover, and in 1805 he and his battalion embarked in the roads of Texel with a view to a landing in England. From there he went with a Batavian division (headed by General Dumonceau), under the overall command of Marmont, to participate in Germany and Austria in the War of the Third Coalition. On 23 October 1806, he became colonel of the 4th regiment of infantry, (Note: Now of the Kingdom of Holland which had succeeded the Batavian Republic.) which regiment was part of the Dutch division in the years 1806-1808, which, again under the command of general Dumonceau, reinforced the French troops in northern Germany. In November 1808 he was given command of the regiment of grenadiers of the Guard and shortly afterwards of the corps of midshipmen of the Guard. On 17 February 1809, promoted to major-general, he was immediately charged with command of the 1st brigade of the Dutch auxiliary corps, which, under the command of lieutenan-general Gatien, was destined as part of the Xth French army corps to fight against von Schill in northern Germany, and then to act against the other Freikorps, mostly led by the Duke of Brunswick-Oels.

At the beginning of the year 1810 Antingh was military governor of the fortress town of Breda, when in the waning days of the Kingdom of Hollannd, he was faced with a dilemma. Marshal Oudninot appeared before the fortress at the head of a strong force of French troops and demanded the surrender of the place. As there was no state of war with France at the time, and Anthing was loath to start one, he tried diplomacy. He proposed to let the French troops enter, but only as those of a "friendly Power". When the French had thus gained entry they stormed his personal residence and stole the keys to the city. Anthing then had no option but to resign his governorship in protest.

After the annexation of the Kingdom of Holland to the First French Empire, which followed a few months later, he transferred to the French service, retaining his rank, during which service he took part in the campaigns of 1813 in Germany (in the 3rd Army Corps under Marshal Ney) and of 1814 in France. At Lützen and at Bautzen he was wounded.

Appointed lieutenant-general by king Louis XVIII of France on 19 June 1814, he applied for and received his discharge from French service on 6 August of that year, after which he was reassigned to the newly formed Dutch army (Note: The Netherlands had re-emerged from French annexation as the Sovereign Principality of the United Netherlands.) as major-general (Note: This was not a demotion as the Dutch and French army ranks were not aligned. A Dutch major-general was equivalent to a French general de division. The rank of general de brigade did not exist in the Dutch army at that time.) on 27 August 1814, and shortly thereafter (18 October) was tasked to act as commander of the newly formed army in the Dutch East Indies, which would form part of that Dutch army. Colonel Hendrik Merkus de Kock was to be assigned to him as Chief of the General Staff, while it had been stipulated that Anthing should be given the rank of lieutenant-general, de Kock that of major-general, "from the day on which they shall have put out to sea from their native ports".

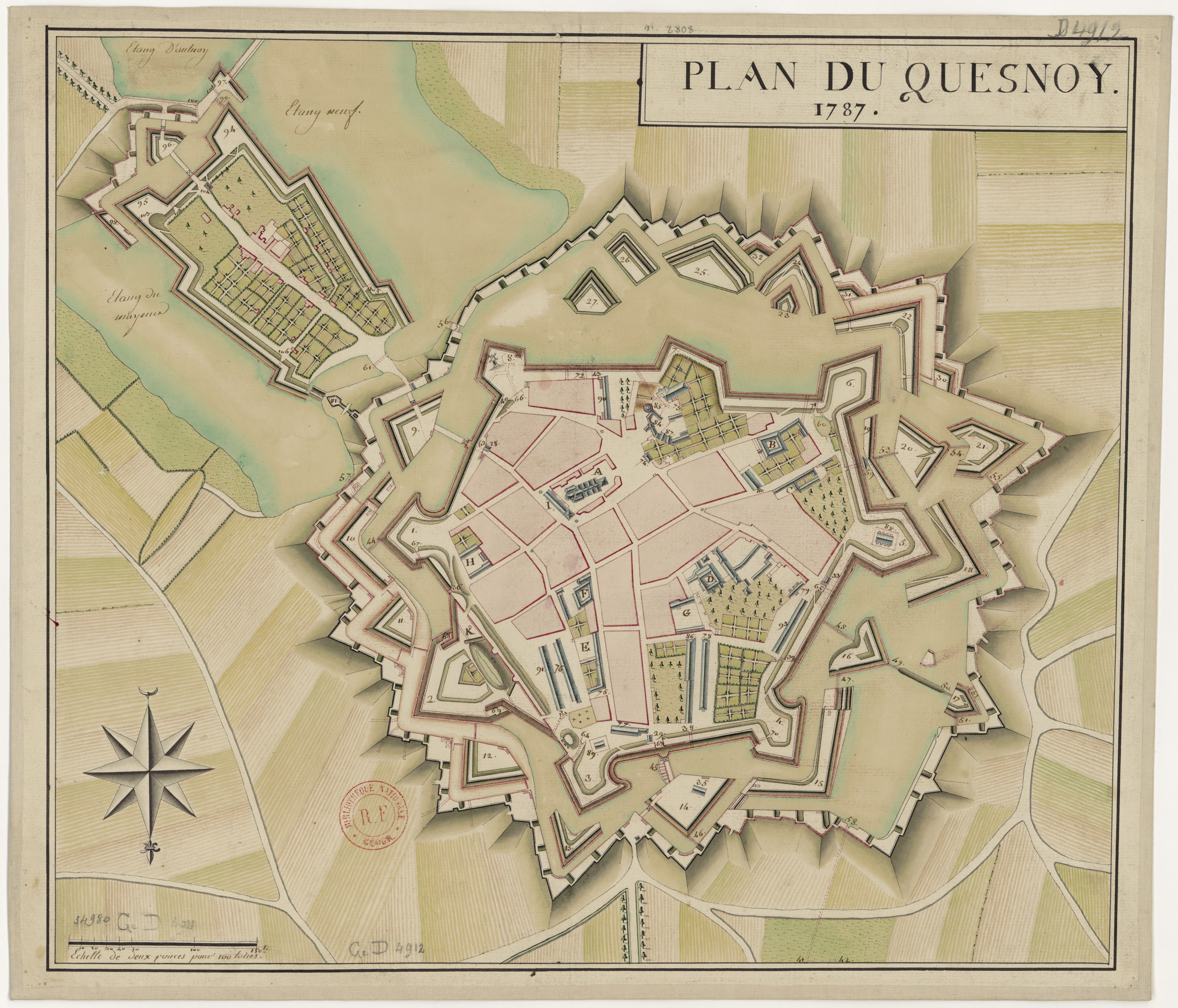
Map of the fortress of Le Quesnoy, captured by the Indies Brigade a.o. in 1815

Initially, King William I of the Netherlands had hoped that this could happen before the end of the year 1814. It soon became apparent, however, that this would not be possible, and when Napoleon had landed in Golfe-Juan on 1 March 1815, and had reached Paris in 20 days, it was understood that the Indies Brigade, already assembled, would remain in Europe for the time being. Anthing was now promoted to lieutenant-general on 21 April 1815. During the campaign in the Southern Netherlands, he and his brigade were assigned to the First Dutch division, which was deployed under the command of Prince Frederik of the Netherlands, first at Oudenaarde, later at Halle near Brussels, to guard against outflanking of the Anglo-Dutch army from the direction of Mons. As a result, he could not take part in the military operations at Quatre-Bras and Waterloo. (Note: The Dutch First Division of which the Indies Brigadse formed a part was not physically present at the battle, because Wellington did not order them to engage. The division was, however, part of the order of Battle.) When the decision there had fallen against Napoleon, the Indies Brigade took an active part in the containment and capture of the fortresses of le Quesnoy, Valenciennes and Condé. On 15 August, Prince Frederick took leave of Anthing and the officers of his brigade at Curgies (as well as Valenciennes) whereupon the march back to the fatherland was begun. On 6 September the brigade separated from the Dutch mobile army in order to prepare for its passage to the Indies.

On 29 October 1815, the small navy squadron, which was to transport the first KNIL army commander with the first troops from the new United Kingdom of the Netherlands to the Asiatic possessions, sailed from Texel. One of the Commissioners-General of the Dutch East Indies who were going to take over the East Indies archipelago from the British, Rear-Admiral Arnold Adriaan Buyskes, was in command of it. Anthing was given a berth on the Zr. Ms. Admiraal De Ruyter with about six hundred officers and soldiers. The voyage was far from smooth. Calm winds and violent storms alternated. The ration of water had to be reduced to half a bottle per head. Violent disagreements between the prickly army commander and the commander of the ship of the line, Colonel 't Hooft, made the stay on board even more unpleasant. (Note: Anthing is quoted as saying that 't Hooft "... could be good on a trekschuit from The Hague to Delft, but he was no good for bringing a ship with troops to Batavia".) It was not until 21 May 1816 that the De Ruyter anchored on the roadstead of Batavia with 116 seriously ill people, while no less than 48 persons, including 6 officers, had succumbed during the crossing. However, the army commander was no longer among those on board. When the De Ruyter entered the bay of Benkoelen around mid-May, he declared that he would not set foot on this ship again. When he could not get any ships to transfer all his troops to, he bought at his own expense (5,200 guilders) a small schooner, on which he and his family, some officers and about 30 soldiers, who had previously sailed at sea, and been recruited to crew, had a few days before the De Ruyter, set sail, under the leadership of the captain of the infantry (former naval officer) Meijer. When they finally landed at Anjer, Anthing went overland to Batavia, arriving there on 10 June 1816.

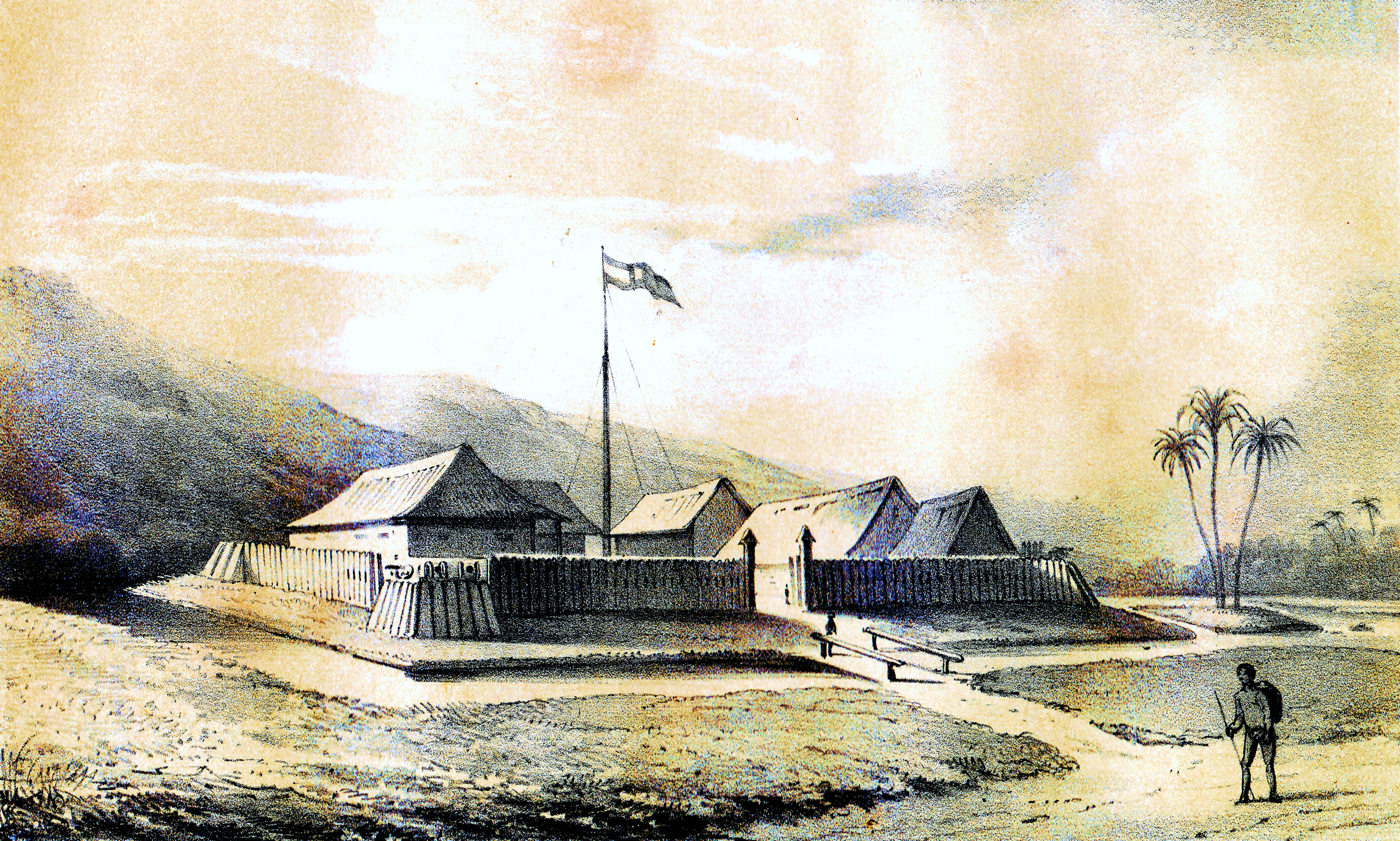
Fort of the K.N.I.L at Sambas 1823

It was not until 19 August 1816, that the administration passed from the British to Dutch authority. Until that time the Dutch armed forces remained in an encampment at Meester Cornelis. On 2 September, the army commander went on his first inspection tour of Java after which, having returned to Batavia, he submitted a report, dated 23 October, on the state of the forts on Java and Madura. Lack of tact on his part, in connection with the content of art. 43 of the government regulations: "All military commanders of the state serving in the Indies at sea or on land receive no orders there other than those of the Governor-General", caused difficulties and frictions to arise in his relationship with the government supreme authority. Several times, including in his letter of 7 January 1817, however, he vigorously and warmly defended the interests of his officers. Though troops of the Indies Brigade, among them captain Meijer, now promoted to major, took part in the suppression of the insurrection at Ambon and Saparua, Anthing was not personally involved in that campaign. (Note: An interesting question is why not? It was already unusual that Anthing, as a lt.-general had to defer to Buyskes, as a rear-admiral, so one rank lower, though as long as they were on the way to the Indies in ships this may have been logical. But why give the command of a campaign that had to be fought mainly by soldiers to a naval officer? It is possible that Buyskes just pulled rank as a Commissioner-General and former lt.-governor-general with experience in the country.) On 23 January 1818, he was honorably discharged from his post, although he continued to perform his functions for some time afterwards, returning to the Netherlands only in 1819, where he was retired on 18 April 1820.

Anthing died on 7 February 1823 after having lived the last years of his live in The Hague.

== Sources ==
- Blok, P. J.; Molhuysen, P. C., eds. (1921), "Anthing, Carl Heinrich Wilhelm", Nieuw Nederlandsch biografisch woordenboek (DNBL) (in Dutch), Sijthoff, pp. 20–24
