= Kyai Sadrach =

Indonesian evangelist

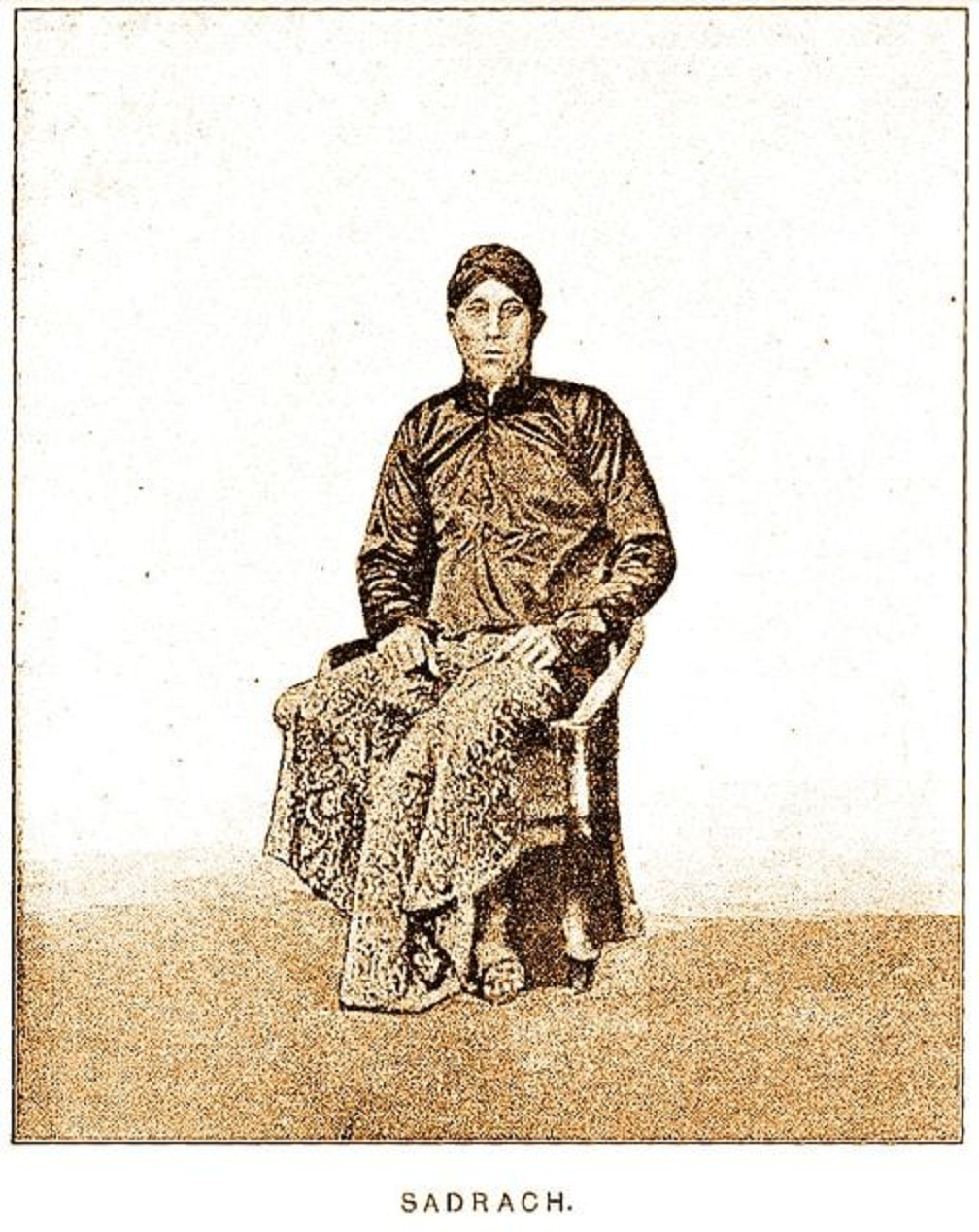

Personal details
- Born: 1835 Jepara, Dutch East Indies
- Died: November 14, 1924 (aged 88–89) Purworejo, Dutch East Indies
- Denomination: Sadrach's community

Kyai Sadrach (1835 – 14 November 1924) was an indigenous Javanese evangelist who served in Central Java, Indonesia. Sadrach is knowned for his approach towards Christianity, which incorporated elements of Javanese culture. At the time of his death, his network of congregations had grown to around 20,000 people.

== Early life and conversion ==
Sadrach was born around 1835 in Jepara Residency, originally named Radin. However, another source suggests that he may have been born in the Demak Residency. While studying at a Muslim cleric school in Jombang, he changed his name to Radin Abas. He then moved to Semarang, where he met an evangelist named Hoezoo. Later, Radin Abas studied Christianity (catechetical) under Hoezoo's guidance. During the classes, he was introduced to a senior, Kyai Ibrahim Tunggul Wulung, who had already converted to Christianity and came from the same region, Bondo, Jepara. Eventually, Radin determined to follow Tunggul Wulung's path. Tunggul Wulung and Radin traveled to Batavia, where Radin was finally baptized on 14 April 1867, and became a member of Zion Church of Batavia, a Reformed church. He was 26 years old when he was baptized and received the Christian name Sadrach.

== Evangelistic efforts ==
After his baptism, Sadrach was given the responsibility of distributing Christian brochures and books door to door among the residences in Batavia. Later, he went to Semarang, where he met Kyai Tunggul Wulung, who had already established Christian villages such as Banyuwoto, Tegalombo, and Bondo in Jepara. Sadrach became the leader of the Bondo congregation as Tunggul Wulung traveled to evangelize more people. When Tunggul Wulung returned to Bondo, Sadrach, at the age of 35, set out for Kediri and later to Purworejo.

In 1869, in Purworejo, Sadrach met and was adopted by a priest named C.V. Stevens-Philips. A year later, he moved to Karangjasa, 25 km south of Purworejo. His decision to leave Steven-Philips reflects a characteristic behavior of any kyai during that time, a motif of confidence and independence. Kyai Ibrahim was the first to be baptized, followed by Kyai Kasanmetaram, who was quite famous during that period. The method Sadrach used to spread his beliefs was through debates, which sometimes lasted for several days.

Since then, the kyais stopped their catechetical instruction with Stevens-Philips and instead received it from Sadrach. However, the relationship between Sadrach and Stevens-Philips continued, as Sadrach considered Stevens-Philips his guardian, which helped him maintain a connection with the colonial government. Additionally, all of Sadrach’s early students were baptized by pastors from the Dutch Mission.

== Later life ==
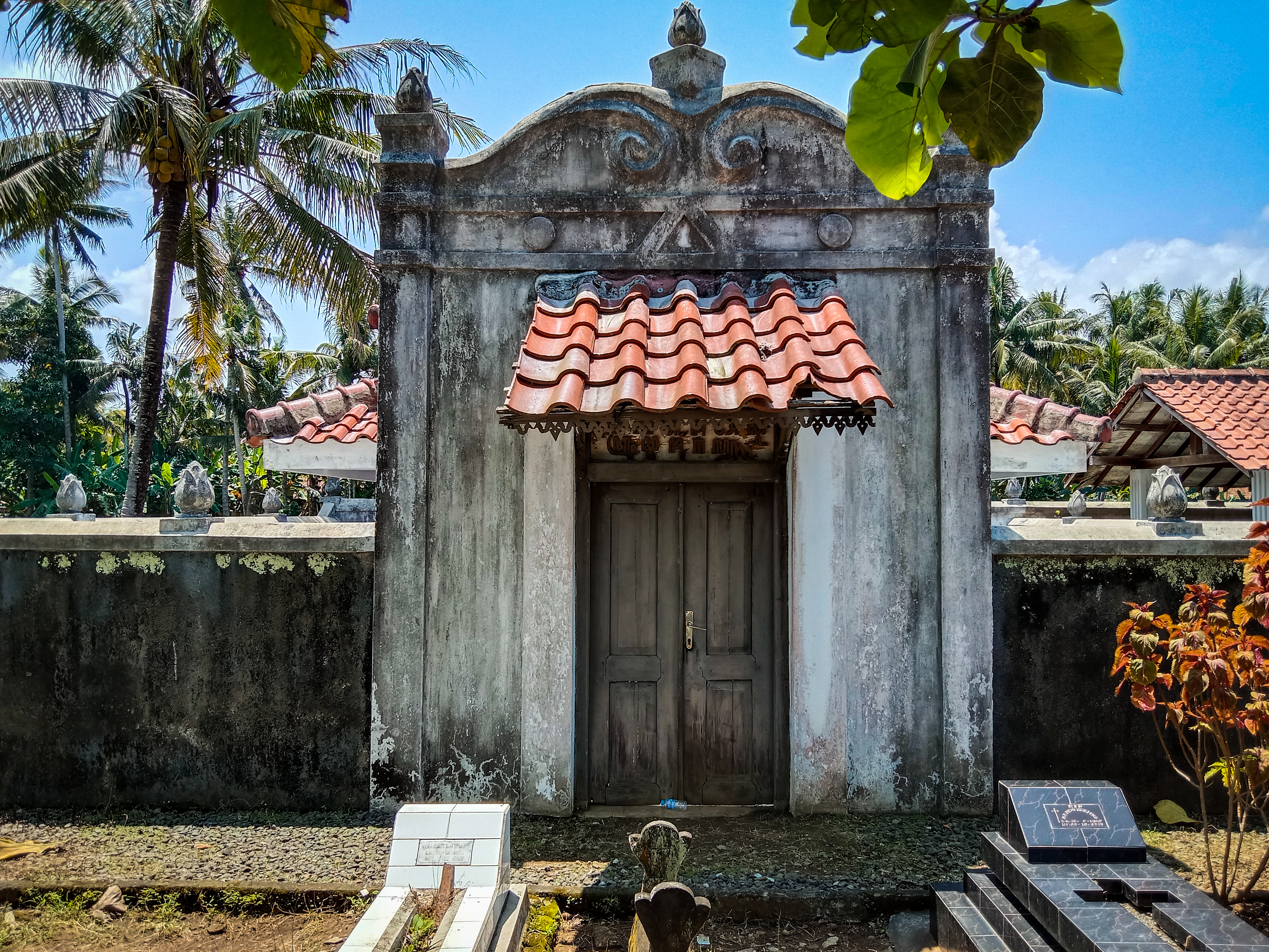
Sadrach's tomb in Purworejo

Sadrach became an influential leader, admired not only for his skill in public debates but also for his ability to overcome dark magic. The Dutch colonial authorities once captured him, fearing his potential political influence over the local native population. He was detained for three months due to insufficient evidence, after which he resumed his work without further challenges. Later, Sadrach incorporated Javanese symbols into his teachings, such as the broom, which was distributed to his 80 followers. The broom symbolized the need for unity, with each follower compared to a stick that, when interlocked, forms a strong, inseparable whole. Through it he reminded the congregation to remain united in faith through Jesus Christ.

On 14 November 1924, at the age of nearly 90, Radin Abas Sadrach Supranata died. At his funeral, relatives and notable figures such as the regents of Kutoarjo and Kulon Progo were present, demonstrating that Sadrach was widely recognized during his time.

== Sources ==
- Partonadi, Sutarman Soediman (1990), Sadrach's community and its contextual roots : a nineteenth century Javanese expression of Christianity, Rodopi, ISBN 978-90-5183-094-1
