= HMS Thistle (1808) =

Royal Navy schooner (1808–1811)

History

United Kingdom
- Name: HMS Thistle
- Ordered: February 1808
- Builder: Bermuda
- Launched: 27 September 1808
- Honours and awards: Naval General Service Medal with clasp "Thistle 10 Feby. 1810"
- Fate: Wrecked 6 March 1811

General characteristics
- Class & type: Shamrock-class schooner
- Tons burthen: 15032/94 (bm)
- Length: 78 ft 8 in (24.0 m); 60 ft 8 1/8 in (18.494 m)
- Beam: 21 ft 7 in (6.58 m)
- Draught: 7 ft 10 in (2.39 m) Ship complement =50
- Armament: 2 × 6-pounder guns + 8 × 12-pounder carronades
- Notes: All measurements are per design, not "as built"

HMS Thistle was a Shamrock-class schooner launched at Bermuda on 27 February 1802. She participated in one notable single ship action that resulted (many years later) in the Admiralty awarding her crew the Naval General service Medal (NGSM). She was wrecked on 6 March 1811.

== Career ==
Lieutenant Peter Proctor commissioned Thistle in 1808.

On 25 March 1809 the French sloop Fortunée arrived in Bermuda, a prize to Thistle. Fortunée had been sailing from Guadeloupe to Bordeaux.

In late October Thistle sent into Halifax, Nova Scotia the American vessel Susquehanna, Brown, master. Susquehanna had been sailing from Baltimore to Tonningen.

On 10 February 1810, Thistle gave chase to a vessel near Bermuda. After seven hours she caught up with her quarry, which hoisted Dutch colours, opened fire, and attempted to ram Thistle. The two vessels exchanged fire for about an hour when the Dutch vessel attempted to sail off. A running engagement ensued. After four hours the Dutch vessel struck her colours. She was the Dutch snow Havik, and had been built in Batavia with an estimated burthen of 200–250 tons. She was armed with six 3-pounder guns and two 1-pounder swivel guns. (This gave her a broadside of 10 pounds, versus Thistle's broadside of 54 pounds.)

Havik had a crew of 30 men under the command of Lieutenant J. Steelingh. Havik also had two passengers, the former lieutenant-governor of Batavia, Rear-Admiral Arnold Adriaan Buyskes, and his adjutant. Havik, which was on her way to Europe with a cargo of indigo and spices, had one man killed and seven men badly wounded; Buyskes was among the injured, being shot in his left thigh by a British bullet. On Thistle, a marine was killed and seven men were wounded, Proctor being one of the wounded. During the initial exchange of fire three of Thistle's carronades had been dismounted.

Thistle and Havik arrived at Bermuda on 20 February. Havik arrived at Portsmouth from Bermuda on 14 June 1810. Her cargo was reported to have a value of £40,000.

Proctor was promoted to Commander in May 1810. In 1847 the Admiralty awarded the NGSM with clasp "Thistle 10 Feby. 1810" to any surviving claimants from the action; there were none. Lieutenant George M'Pherson replaced Proctor in June 1810. Thistle carried to London the seaman Robert Jeffrey who in 1807 Commander Warwick Lake of HMS Recruit had marooned on Sombrero, Anguilla.

== Loss ==
The government hired Thistle to carry dispatches and the January mail for New York from Falmouth, Cornwall. She sailed on 12 January 1811. Lloyd's List reported that Thistle had been lost on 6 March 1811 near New York, United States with the loss of six of her crew. The mail was saved and delivered to New York on 9 March.

The subsequent courtmartial established that the loss was due to the inaccuracy of the chart, which showed incorrect soundings. In all, four men died in attempts to get to shore. The rest were pulled to shore on a line from the beach. Over the next few days some of her stores were salvaged and sold. On 13 March the wreck was sold to a local man for $135. The wreck occurred on Maransquam Beach, about nine leagues south of Sandy Hook.

== Bibliography ==
- Hepper, David J. (1994). British Warship Losses in the Age of Sail, 1650–1859. Rotherfield: Jean Boudriot. ISBN 0-948864-30-3.
- van Rees, H.B.; Krijgsman, A.C. (2018). "Het Journaal van Willem Veerman, tweede episode – Aan boord van Des Koning's schip "de Havik"" (PDF). Tenanker. 1 (25).
- Winfield, Rif (2008). British Warships in the Age of Sail 1793–1817: Design, Construction, Careers and Fates. Seaforth Publishing. ISBN 978-1-861-76246-7.
