= Havik (1808 ship) =

History

Kingdom of Holland
- Name: Havik
- Builder: Batavia (Note: Hackman, a major source, probably drawing on Lloyd's Register (LR), states that Peter Proctor was built in India, in 1808. However, the most complete listing of ships built in Calcutta does not list her. Neither does she, or any other vessel of her burthen, appear in the list of ships built in India admitted to the registries of Great Britain before 1814. The Register of Shipping gives her origin as Batavia.)
- Launched: 1808
- Captured: February 1810

United Kingdom
- Name: Peter Proctor
- Launched: 1810 by purchase of a prize
- Fate: Last listed 1845

General characteristics
- Tons burthen: 200–250 (est.), or 264, or 267 (bm)
- Sail plan: Snow
- Armament: Havik: 6 × 3-pounder guns + 2 × 1-pounder swivel guns; Peter Proctor: 10 × 6-pounder + 2 × 12-pounder carronades

Havik was an 8-gun snow of the navy of the Kingdom of Holland built in Batavia, Dutch East Indies in either 1808 or 1809. Dutch colonial authorities purchased her and had her fitted out for naval service in 1809; she then sailed to the Atlantic Ocean. The Royal Navy captured her in 1810. She then sailed to Britain where her new civilian owners named her Peter Proctor, after the British lieutenant who captured her. She traded widely and was last listed in 1845. She brought the first group of coolies from India to Australia in 1837.

== Havik ==
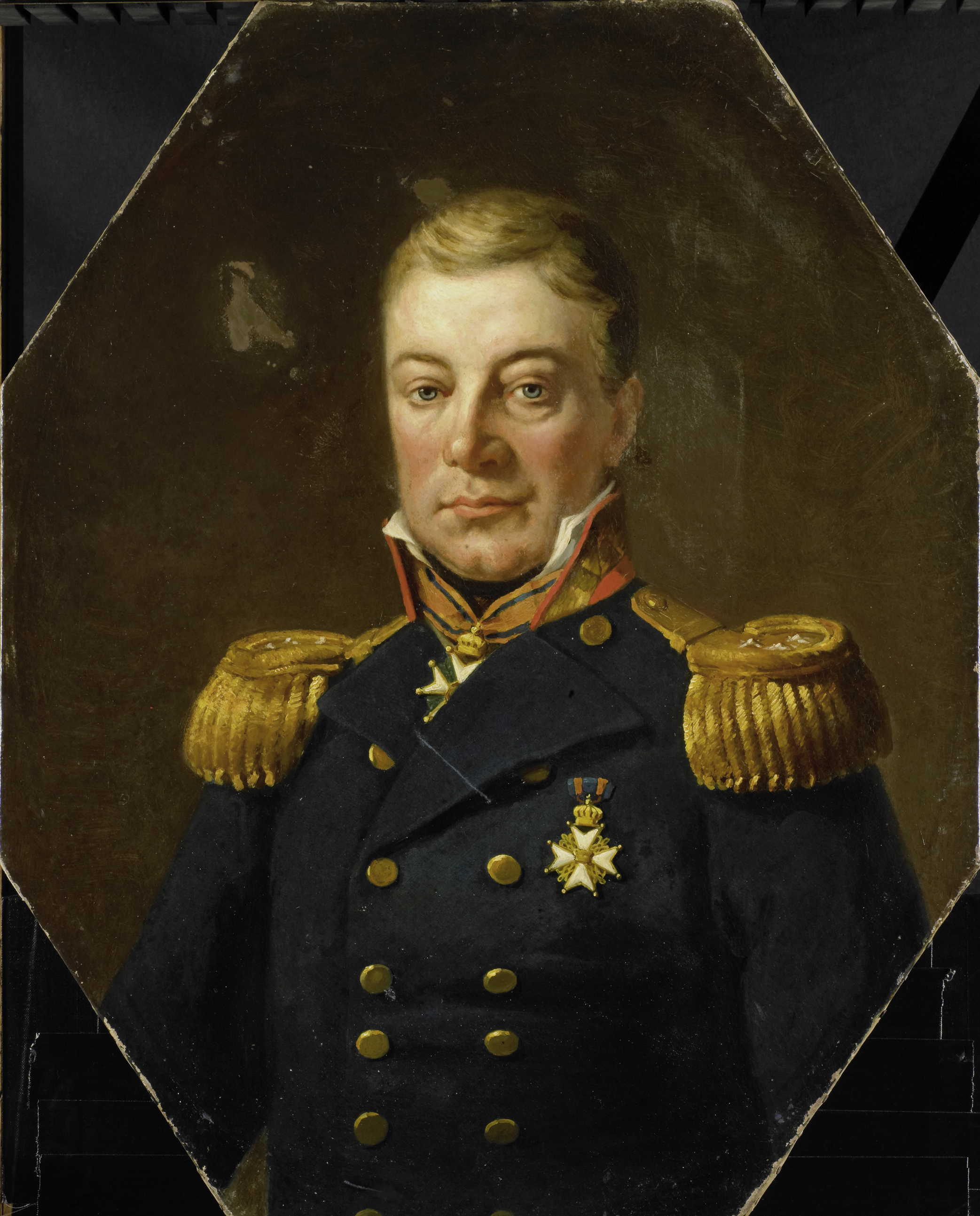
Arnold Adriaan Buyskes, who was onboard Havik when she was captured

The journal of van Willem Veerman, a junior officer serving on Havik, is a little a little unclear about where around Batavia she was built. His journal says, in translation "This ship was built in the town of Lassem, on the north shore of Java near The city of Cheribon. Havik was built as a merchant ship, and now bought for the government and put into service." The main shipyard at Batavia prior to 1806 was Onrust Island; the Royal Navy destroyed the shipyard there in 1800 and again 1806, the latter attack occurring during the Java campaign of 1806–1807. Havik, which had an estimated burthen of 200–250 tons (bm), underwent fitting and provisioning in September 1809. She set out on 20 October, armed with six 3-pounder guns and two 1-pounder swivel guns and crewed by 32 men under Lieutenant J. Steelingh. Rear-Admiral Arnold Adriaan Buyskes and his adjutant also embarked on Havik as passengers.

On 10 February 1810, the 10-gun British schooner HMS Thistle near Bermuda spotted Havik en route to Europe. After a seven hour chase, Thistle caught up with Havik, which hoisted Dutch colours, opened fire, and attempted to ram Thistle. The two vessels exchanged fire for about an hour when Havik, which had a broadside of 10 pounds versus Thistle's broadside of 54 pounds, attempted to sail off. A running engagement ensued, and lasted for four hours until Havik struck her colours after she had expended all her ammunition. The Dutch suffered one man killed and seven men badly wounded during the engagement, one of the injured being Buyskes, whose left thigh was badly wounded. On Thistle, a marine was killed and seven men were wounded, one of whom was the ship's commander, Lieutenant Peter Proctor. During the initial exchange of fire three of Thistle's carronades were dismounted.

Thistle and Havik arrived at Bermuda on 20 February. Havik arrived at Portsmouth from Bermuda on 14 June 1810. Her cargo of indigo and spices was reported to have a value of £40,000.

== Peter Proctor ==
Peter Proctor, Bouner, master, first appeared in online records when on 30 December 1810 she sailed from Gravesend with the West Indies fleet, bound for St Kitts. After her return in 1811 she sailed for Malta and Smyrna.

Year	Master	Owner	Trade	Source
1811	M.Bonner	Smith & Co.	London–St Kitts	LR
1812	Bonner; Barnett	Helme	London–St Kitts; London–Smyrna	Register of Shipping
1815	B. Barnet; J. Peterkin	Smith & Co.	London transport London–Dominica	LR
1819	J. Peterkin	Baker & Co.	London–Dominica	LR
1821	Brown	Baker & Co.	London–Dominica	LR

On 27 September 1822, Peter Proctor, Brown, master, ran ashore on the lower part of the Knock Sand. She was gotten off after having discharged part of her cargo, and arrived in the Thames. She was returning from St Petersburg with a cargo of tallow and hemp when she grounded. She was stuck for three days, but was gotten off with the assistance of the revenue cutter Fox, Lieutenant St. John, and two fishing vessels. Lieutenant St. John was awarded £120 for the service.

Year	Master	Owner	Trade	Source
1825	J.Brown	Baker & Co.	London–Demerara	LR

On 26 July 1825, Peter Proctor was at Dominica when a major hurricane hit the island. The hurricane sank or damaged many vessels there. Peter Proctor rode out the gale without injury.

Year	Master	Owner	Trade	Source
1826	J.Brown; Fuller	Baker & Co.	London–Dominica	LR
1827	Fuller; Black	Baker & Co.	London–Dominica	LR

On 26 June 1828, Peter Proctor, Black, master, ran aground at Skanör med Falsterbo as she was sailing from London to St Petersburg. She was gotten off. She then put into Carlsham to discharge and effect repairs.

Year	Master	Owner	Trade	Source
1828	Black; Reed	Baker & Co.	London–Elsinor	LR
1829	G.Reed; J.Terry	Allan	London–Quebec	LR
1830	J.Terry	T.&J. Allan	London–Cape of Good Hope	LR

In 1813, the EIC had lost its monopoly on the trade between India and Britain. British ships were then free to sail to India or the Indian Ocean under a license from the EIC. On 25 October 1829, Peter Proctor, J.Terry, master, sailed for Mauritius and Covelong under a license from the EIC. In December 1831, she had to put back to Bristol after having sustained damage. She had been sailing to Boston from Bristol when she lost her bulwarks and boats, and sustained other damage. On her return to Bristol she had been out a month.

Year	Master	Owner	Trade	Source & notes
1832	J.Terry	T.&J. Allan	Bristol	LR; small repairs 1831

The EIC gave up its shipping activities in 1833. Peter Proctor sailed between Britain and India in the early 1830s.

Year	Master	Owner	Trade	Source & notes
1837	G.Barlow	J.Allan	London	LR; large repair 1836

With the ceasing of convict transportation to New South Wales becoming imminent by the late 1830s, the colonists there sought a substitute source of cheap labour. In 1837, a Committee on Immigration identified the possibility of importing coolies from India and China as a solution. John Mackay, an owner of indigo plantations in Bengal and a distillery in Sydney, organised the import of 42 coolies from India who arrived on 24 December 1837, on board Peter Proctor. This was the first sizeable transport of coolie labour into Australia.

Year	Master	Owner	Trade	Source & notes
1839	Barlow; Armstrong	J.Allan	London; London–West Indies	LR; large repair 1836 and damages repaired 1838
1840	Armstrong	J.Allan	London–West Indies; London–Launceston, Tasmania	LR; large repair 1836 and damages repaired 1838
1841	Armstrong	J.Allan	London–Launceston; London–Ceylon	LR; large repair 1836 and damages repaired 1838

== Fate ==
Peter Proctor was last listed in 1846 with data unchanged since 1841.
