= Godert van der Capellen =

Dutch colonial governor (1778–1848)

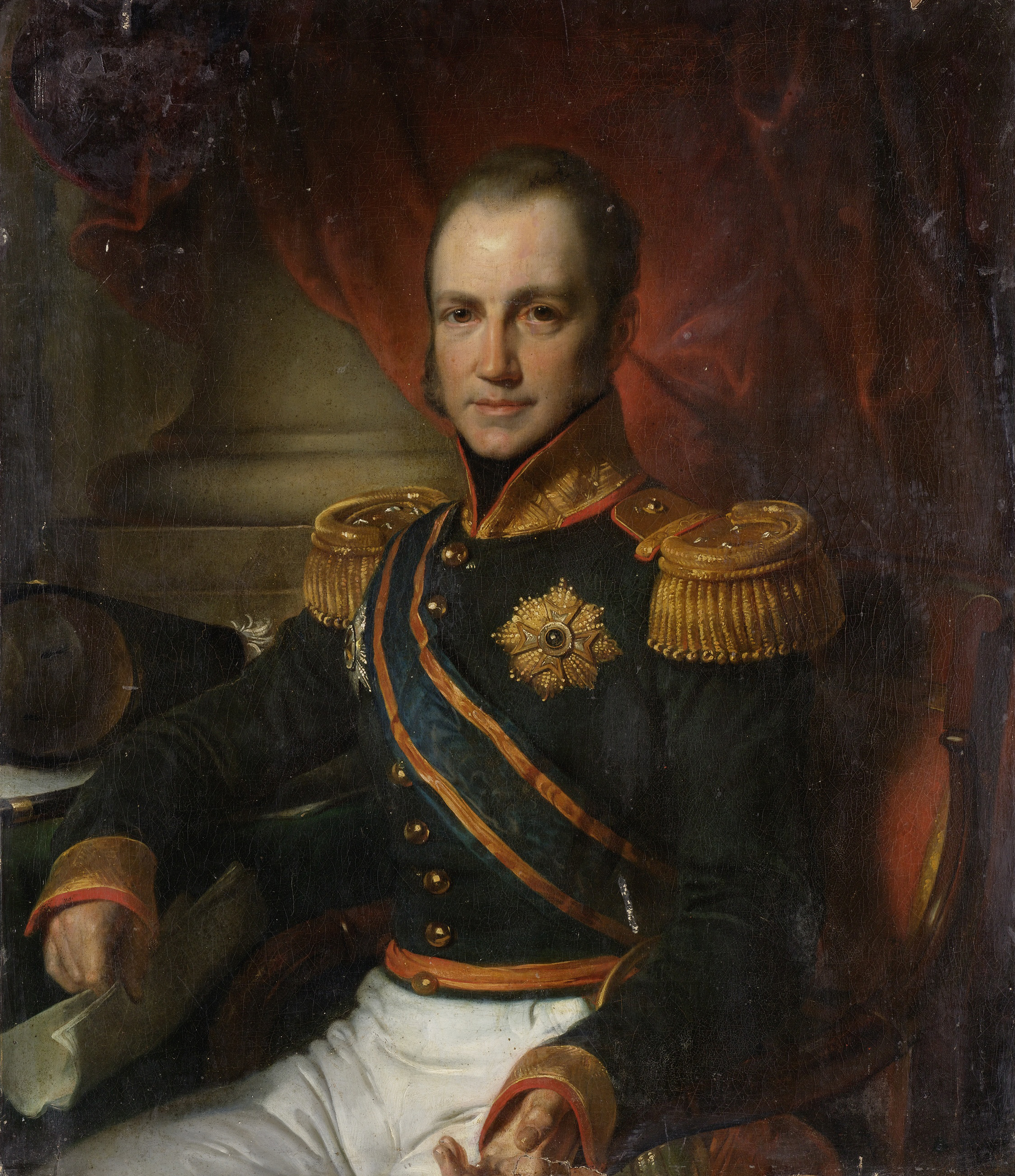
- Portrait by Cornelis Kruseman, c. 1816–1857

Governor-General of the Dutch East Indies
- In office 16 January 1819 – 1 January 1826
- Monarch: William I
- Preceded by: Himself, Cornelis Theodorus Elout, Arnold Adriaan Buyskes (as Commissioners-General)
- Succeeded by: Leonard du Bus de Gisignies; Hendrik Merkus de Kock

Commissioner-General of the Dutch East Indies
- In office 19 August 1816 – 16 January 1819 Serving with Cornelis Theodorus Elout and Arnold Adriaan Buyskes
- Monarch: William I
- Preceded by: John Fendall (as British Lieutenant-Governor)
- Succeeded by: Himself (as Governor-General of the Dutch East Indies)

Secretary of Commerce and Colonies
- In office 6 April 1814 – 29 July 1814
- Monarch: William I
- Preceded by: Paulus van der Heim (Minister of the Navy and Colonial Affairs, 1811)
- Succeeded by: Joan Cornelis van der Hoop (as Secretary-General of Commerce and Colonies)

Personal details
- Born: Godert Alexander Gerard Philip van der Capellen; 15 December 1778 Utrecht, Dutch Republic
- Died: 10 April 1848 (aged 69) Utrecht, Netherlands
- Spouse: Jacoba van Serooskerken (m. 1803)
- Parents: Alexander van der Capellen (father); Maria Taets van Amerongen (mother)
- Education: Utrecht University

Godert Alexander Gerard Philip, Baron van der Capellen (Utrecht, 15 December 1778 – De Bilt, 10 April 1848) was a Dutch statesman. He held several important posts under the Kingdom of Holland and the Sovereign Principality of the United Netherlands, before he was appointed as one of the Commissioners-General of the Dutch East Indies. Later he was appointed Governor-General of that colony.

== Life ==
=== Personal life ===
Born in Utrecht, Van der Capellen was the son of Maria Taets van Amerongen, and the cavalry colonel Alexander Philip van der Capellen. His father died when he was eight, and his education was entrusted to the Walloonminister Pierre Chevalier. He studied law at Utrecht university, and also spent time studying in under Georg Friedrich von Martens and Johann Friedrich Blumenbach at the University of Göttingen. In 1803, he married Jacoba Elisabeth van Tuyll van Serooskerken. They had no children.

=== Career ===
He started his official career in the province of Utrecht under the Batavian Republic, where he was appointed in several functions in the sphere of Public finance Under the Kingdom of Holland he was made responsible for the integration of the formerly German areas known as East Frisia, that had been "apportioned" by Napoleon to that kingdom. He was subsequently made landdrost (Prefect) of that area in 1808 and soon thereafter Minister of the Interior and a member of the Raad van State. He was one of the ministers who advised king Louis to resist the advances of his brother Napoleon, but when Louis abdicated in favor of his son, he followed him in exile. He remained with the ex-king until power was returned to the son of the former Dutch stadtholder, now the "sovereign prince" William I of the Netherlands, in 1813. William appointed him envoy to the Governor-General of the Austrian Netherlands, Karl von Vincent in Brussels in May 1814. When William himself became Governor-Geral there on 1 August 1814, he appointed Van der Capellen to be his representative to do the actual governing on 12 August 1814, with the title of Secretaris van Staat (minister). However, William recalled him already in September 1814 to become one of the Commissioners-General of the Dutch East Indies with Cornelis Theodorus Elout and Arnold Adriaan Buyskes, to implement the return of that colony to Dutch administration on the basis of the Anglo-Dutch Treaty of 1814.

Before they could depart, however, Van der Capellen was charged with a secret diplomatic mission to the Congress of Vienna, to plead the interests of William in the former domains of his family in Germany. That mission did not succeed, but Van der Capellen brought home William's sovereignty over the former Duchy of Luxemburg that became a Grand Duchy in a personal union with the new Kingdom of the United Netherlands. When Napoleon escaped from Elba in 1815, Van der Capellen was temporarily restored to his function of acting Governor-General of the Southern Netherlands. During the Hundred Days, he was in Brussels, where he showed much sang froid in the days of the Battle of Waterloo, staying at his post, where many others fled. He was aware of the resistance of many Belgian notables against the new constitution for the Kingdom of the United Netherlands, but could not dissuade William of forcing that through.

On 29 October 1815 the Commissioners-General could finally depart for the Dutch East Indies aboard a Dutch naval squadron commanded by Buyskes. Van der Capellen himself arrived in Batavia on 19 May 1816, a few days before the other two Commissioners, because he traveled in a different ship. On 18 August 1816, the British allowed the Commissioners to take over the government of Java. In the almost three years that followed, Van der Capellen acted as the "executive", fulfilling the role of acting-Governor-General, whereas Buyskes took care of military matters, and Elout did most of the legislative work. On 16 January 1819 the triumvirate ended and Van der Capellen formally assumed the Governor-Generalship, as head of the new High Government of the Dutch East Indies.

On 28 April 1822, he was made a Baron. In 1824 he cancelled contracts of native rulers in the Vorstenlanden with European and ethnic Chinese businessmen for long-running leases of land, because he feared that the common Javanese people would be exploited. (Note: The ordinance in question was actually drafted by Hendrik Jan van de Graaff, a member of the High Government since 1820, who had become a trusted advisor of Van der Capellen.) This forced the native chiefs to pay back the advances they had received. They responded by further exploiting the cultivators. Hard-pressed cultivators had to pay taxes in money and turned to Chinese moneylenders. This caused unrest in Yogyakarta. As the post-Napoleonic Wars boom in coffee and sugar exports faded, the budget of the colony went into deficit. Much money was also needed to quell unrest outside of Java, like the First expedition to Palembang (1819), Second expedition to Palembang (1821), Padri War (1821–1837), Expedition to the West Coast of Borneo (1823), First Bone War (1824–1825), and especially the Java War with Prince Diponegoro that started during his tenure in office. Baron van der Capellen made an inspection tour of the Moluccas and Celebes in 1824 and abolished the hated spices monopoly and the limit on the number of spice trees. (Note: During this tour Van der Capellen promulgated a proclamation to the native population of the Moluccas in which he promised many improvements in their circumstances. This proclamation may have been Multatuli's inspiration for the Toespraak tot de hoofden van Lebak in Max Havelaar (pp. 105-114).) These measures were not popular with the colonial establishment and the Oudgastenpartij. Herman Warner Muntinghe's proposal for the establishment of the Nederlandsche Handelmaatschappij (NHM) in which King William heavily invested, was adopted in 1825. Van der Capellen was opposed to giving the important role to the NHM that king William decreed. He was generally opposed to seeing Indies revenue that was needed for the Indies government, leak away to the Mother country. In this context there was an incident in which the High Government refused to follow an order to deliver part of the coffee harvest to the NHM, intended as payment for advances the company had made to the Dutch government in Patria, and instead sold the coffee at auction for the benefit of the Netherlands' Indies government. This occasioned the Dutch government to send Leonard du Bus de Gisignies as a Commissioner-General to investigate Van der Capellen's conduct. (Note: There was also the matter of the coinage in the Dutch East Indies, that had been reformed under the Commissioners-General. It turned out that the intrinsic value of the new Netherlands Indies gulden had been undervalued against that of the Javanese silver rupee (or its nominal value overstated), so that as a consequence of Gresham's law the gulden was driven out of circulation, causing a shortage of ready money. The High Government tried to remedy this by importing silver provided by a trading house in Calcutta on unfavorable terms, which made the public finances of the colony even worse. Van der Capellen was blamed for this.) He soon took over the Governor-Generalship himself; Van der Capellen was dismissed as of 1 January 1826.

After his return in the Netherlands Van der Capellen was named President of the Board of Trustees of the University of Utrecht in 1828. In 1838, he attended the coronation of Queen Victoria in London as the Dutch envoy. Van der Capellen then served as the Lord Chamberlain of King William II. He spent much time in Paris, often as the guest of king Louis Philippe I. The events of the French Revolution of 1848 that he experienced in France, took a heavy emotional toll on Van der Capellen. He returned to his estate Vollenhove near De Bilt in the Netherlands, where in a moment of temporary insanity he ended his own life on 10 April 1848.

== Sources ==
- Blok, P.J.; Molhuysen, P.C., eds. (1911). "Capellen, Mr. Godert Alexander Gerard Philip baron van der". Nieuw Nederlandsch biografisch woordenboek (DBNL) (in Dutch). Sijthoff. pp. 569–578.
- The Meyers Konversations-Lexikon
- Wurtzburg, Charles Edward (1953). Raffles of the Eastern Isles. Oxford University Press. ISBN 978-0-19-582605-0

Political offices
Preceded by John Fendall as British Lieutenant-Governor	Commissioner-General of the Dutch East Indies; 1816–1819; With: Cornelis Theodorus Elout; Arnold Adriaan Buyskes	Succeeded by Himself as Governor-General
Preceded by Himself, Cornelis Theodorus Elout; Arnold Adriaan Buyskes as Commissioners-General	Governor-General of the Dutch East Indies; 1819–1826	Succeeded by Leonard du Bus de Gisignies; Hendrik Merkus de Kock
