= Cornelis Theodorus Elout =

Dutch statesman (1767–1841)

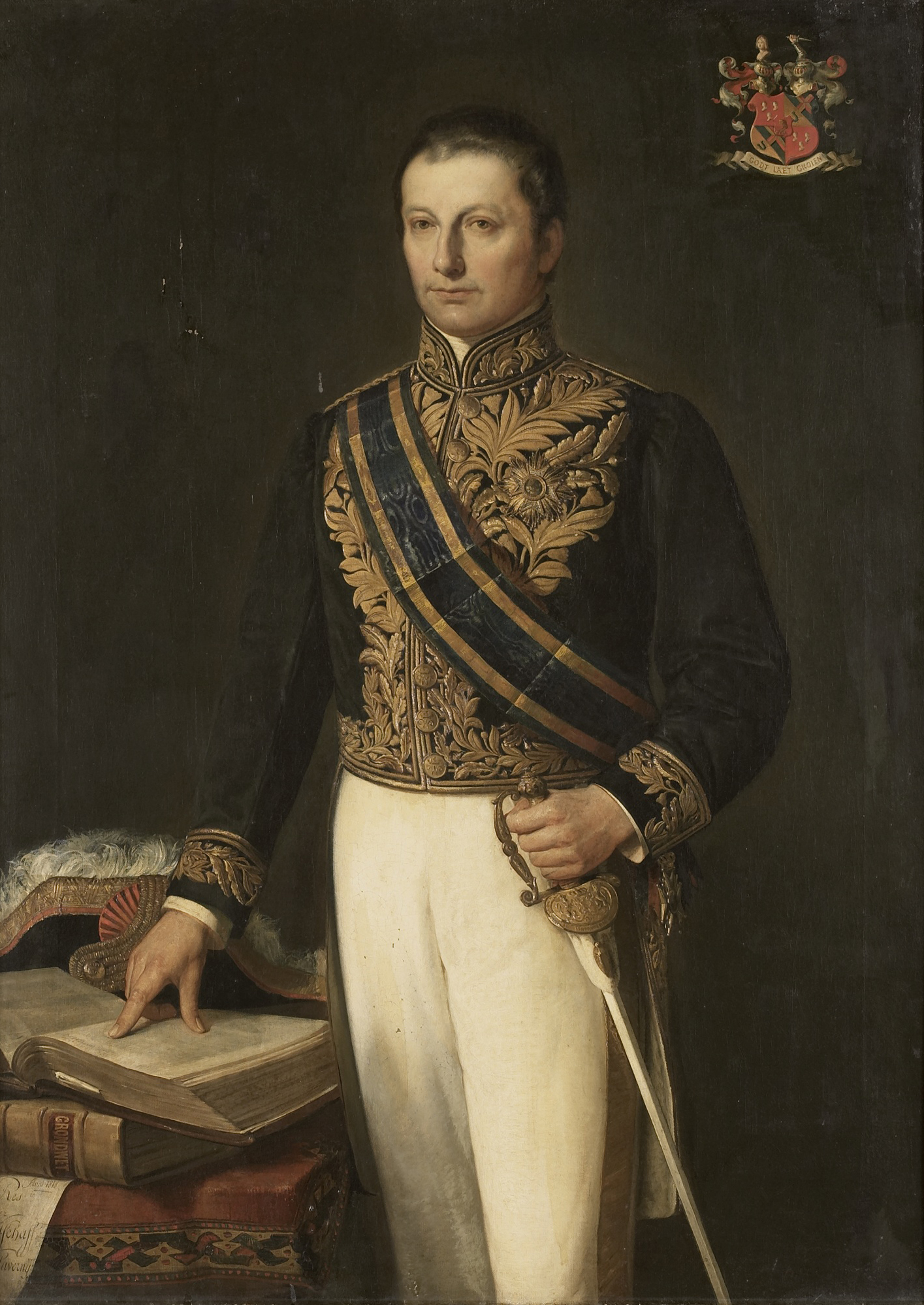
- Cornelis Theodoor Elout by Andries van den Berg

Commissioner-General of the Dutch East Indies Serving with Godert van der Capellen, Arnold Adriaan Buyskes
- In office 19 August 1816 – 16 January 1819
- Preceded by: Newly created
- Succeeded by: Abolished

Minister of Finance
- In office 1 May 1821 – 30 March 1824

Minister of Industry and Colonies
- In office 30 March 1824 – 5 April 1825

Minister of the Navy and Colonies
- In office 5 April 1825 – 1 October 1829

Personal details
- Born: Cornelis Theodorus Elout; 23 March 1767 Haarlem, Netherlands
- Died: 3 May 1841 (aged 74) The Hague Netherlands
- Spouse: Henriette Josina van Eijbergen (m. 1794)
- Children: Pieter Jacob Elout van Soeterwoude; Suzanna Sara Elout; Jacoba Petronella de Bruijn Prince
- Parents: Cornelis Pieter Elout (father); Sara Salomé van Orsoy (mother)
- Education: doctor juris
- Alma mater: Leiden university
- Profession: attorney
- Awards: Knight Grand Cross of the Order of the Netherlands Lion

Cornelis Theodorus Elout (Haarlem, 22 March 1767 – The Hague, 3 May 1841) was a Dutch statesman. As Commissioner of the Dutch East Indies he instituted the landrente tax system in the Dutch East Indies in 1816, and in 1819 promulgated the new Regeringsreglement for that colony together with his colleagues Godert van der Capellen and Arnold Adriaan Buyskes, while also reforming the coinage. After his return to the Netherlands he served as Minister of Finance, Industry, Colonies, and the Navy. He was instrumental in founding the Nederlandsche Handelsmaatschappij. He opposed the introduction of the Cultuurstelsel in the East Indies, but was overruled, and resigned in protest.

== Life ==
=== Personal life ===
ELOUT ( Cornelis Theodorus ), son of Sara Salomé van Orsoy and Cornelis Pieter Elout, was born in Haarlem on 22 March 1767. He completed his legal studies at Leiden University.He defended his dissertation, entitled De testamento duorum una tabula condito (Note: About the last will that is revocable in the absence of children.) on 21 June 1788. After his promotion to Doctor of Laws, he left for Amsterdam to pursue his legal practice.

=== Career ===
==== Becoming a statesman ====
In 1793 he was appointed Bailiff, Dijkgraaf and Upper Beach Guardian of Texel. After he had married Henriette Josina van Eybergen on 3 August, 1794, he was appointed Councilor in the Court of Holland and Zeeland, in which he served until 1802, when he was appointed Attorney-General at the National Court. (Note: As such he prosecuted the member of the Staatsbewind Jacobus Spoors in a case of threats of violence against another prosecutor. The case ended in an acquittal.) In 1804 he was, with CA Ver Huell and JW Janssens, nominated by the Asiatic Council (Note: The government body that had replaced the directors of the VOC after that company's nationalization in 1799.) as Governor-General of the Netherlands Indies. That nomination did not result in an appointment, but in 1805 Elout, after having refused the Ministry of the Interior, was appointed by Grand PensionarySchimmelpenninck, together with Van Grasveld, as Commissioner-General for the Dutch East Indies. Due to the British blockade, he had to travel by way of the United States (to board a neutral ship for the Indies), but was recalled while on the way in Rio de Janeiro after King Louis's accession to the throne in 1806, and his own replacement by Daendels as Governor-General of the Dutch East Indies.

After his return to the Kingdom of Holland he was charged, together with Reuvens and Van Musschenbroek, with the preparation of a new criminal code. Shortly afterwards he was appointed member of the State Council and President of its Third Section. After the Annexation to the First French Empire in 1810, he was first appointed in a conseil pour les affaires de la Hollande to help with the transition, but later withdrew from all employment and in 1811 established his residence in The Hague, where he came into close contact with the members of the Triumvirate of 1813. He was given a place in the commission headed by Gijsbert Karel van Hogendorp charged with the drafting of the constitution (1814) by which the Sovereign Prince William I of the Netherlands was to rule the Netherlands. Elout became a member of the Council of State and of the united North and South Netherlands Commission for the revision of the constitution of the United Kingdom of the Netherlands. In both positions, he rendered excellent services, (Note: Van Hogendorp wrote of him: "Among the northern gentlemen, Mr. Elout, as usual, is distinguished by his activity; he edits the entire constitution.") enjoyed the confidence of the Belgians, including the Count de Merode, and showed himself averse to centralization and all-out involvement of the state in religion, education, science, trade and industry, and committed to true freedom. Specifically, he zealously advocated freedom of the press, public deliberation of the States General, and exclusion of all monopoly in overseas possessions.

==== Commissioner-General of the Dutch Indies ====
Elout was appointed in September 1814 alongside Godert van der Capellen and Arnold Adriaan Buyskes to take over the Dutch East Indies from the British as Commissioners-General of the Dutch East Indies, and to arrange affairs there. Due to the events of the Hundred Days, the fleet in which he sailed only left in October 1815 under the command of Rear-Admiral Buyskes, where Elout sailed in the ship of the line, Zr. Ms. Admiraal Evertsen. Elout accomplished his task in an excellent manner. He was the principal coordinator of the drafting of the so-called Regeringsreglement (a quasi-constitution for the colony). In the meantime the Commissioners had to deal with an insurrection in the Moluccas, that was suppressed by a punitive expedition commanded by Buyskes. The Commissioners also had to deal with chaos in the bureaucracy (the officials that had worked for the British had for the most part to be replaced by new personnel). They implemented the new system of taxation that had been designed under the former British lt.-governor-general Sir Stamford Raffles, known as the landrente; reformed the coinage; reformed the system of Residences, instituted by Daendels; reorganized the public finances and the judicial system; and reformed the cultivation of coffee. On the recommendation of Caspar Georg Carl Reinwardt, the director of the department of Agriculture, the system of primary education was reformed, giving a foundation for the efforts in the 19th century to combat illiteracy in the colony. (Note: Reinwardt also helped bring about a number of other innovations such as a campaign of inoculation against small pox; he founded the botanical gardens in Buitenzorg, the new administrative capital of the colony.) In all of this Elout was the prime mover In January 1819 he inaugurated the high government of the Indies with an elegant speech. He and Buyskes were to return to the Netherlands in the Evertsen. However, that ship proved itself in bad repair. It started to leak severely and near the island Diego Garcia the situation became untenable. The ship foundered, and though the passengers and crew were rescued, Elout lost his personal belongings, among which his diaries in which he had noted all details of his work in the Indies.

==== Ministerial career ====
After having returned to the Netherlands in October, 1819, by way of England, he was showered with honors. Even before his return he had received the appointment (Note: Under the Constitution of 1815 members of the Tweede Kamer were appointed by the Provinciale Staten of the provinces.) for the province of Holland as a member of the House of Representatives of the States General. However, he declined this honor, wrote a report about his mission, and declined the pension of 6,000 guilders due to him. Appointed Minister of Finance on 1 May 1821, he promoted an improved system of trade and taxation. He began to improve the monetary system and to abolish and reduce the lotteries.

In 1824, after Falck's appointment as Ambassador to London, Elout exchanged the Department of Finance for that of Industry and Colonies. In 1825 that of the Navy was added. The establishment of the Nederlandsche Handel-Maatschappij on Elout 's proposal was to "provide for what private trade could not or cannot do, without, however, harming that trade." The situation in the Indies deteriorated due to the cost of the many military conflicts in the 1820s. The new Governor General Johannes van den Bosch, appointed on Elout's recommendation, drove through the introduction of the Cultuurstelsel to improve the public finances, against the will of Elout, who resigned in protest.

==== Minister of State ====
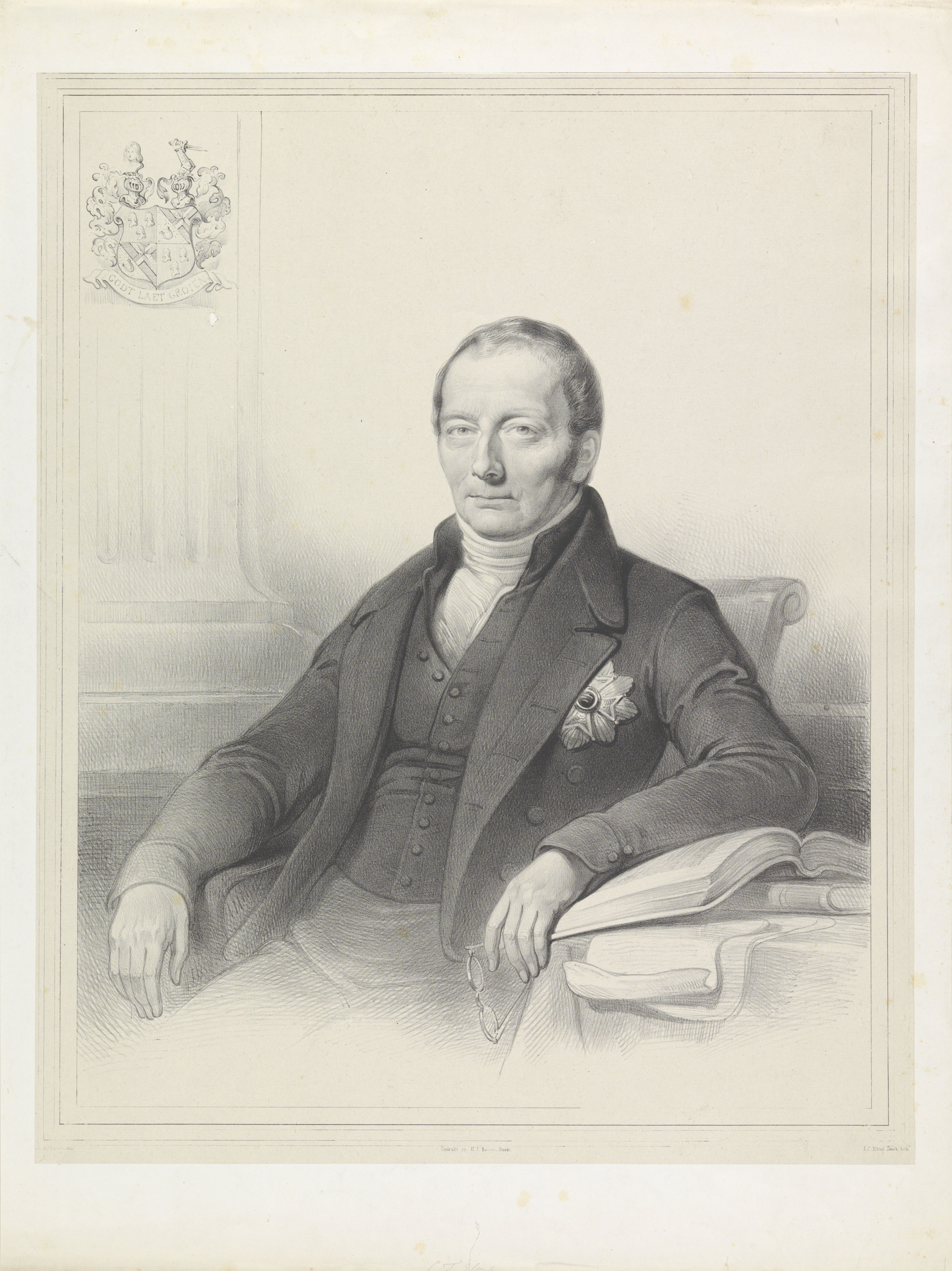
Elout in 1837 as Minister of State (Note: In the upper-left corner the family crest with motto God laat groeien (God grows/Deus adolescit) is shown.)

He retained the rank and title of Minister of State and was charged with a number of honorable commissions, among which the investigation of the Canada question, the arbitration of which had been entrusted to the King of the Netherlands by Great Britain and the United States.

He spent the last years of life alternately on his estate Voorlinden or in The Hague, where he died 3 May 1841.

He was Knight Grand Cross of the Order of the Netherlands Lion, of which he had been appointed Commander when the order was established. He was also a member of the Society of Dutch Literature in Leiden and Director of the Hollandsche Maatschappij van Wetenschappen in Haarlem.

== Sources ==
- Aa, A. J. van der, ed. (1859). "Cornelis Theodorus Elout". Biografisch Woordenboek der Nederlanden. Deel 5 (DBNL) (in Dutch). pp. 97–101.
- Blok, P.J.; Molhuysen, P.C., eds. (1911). "Cornelis Theodorus Elout". Nieuw Nederlandsch biografisch woordenboek (DNBL) (in Dutch). Sijthoff. pp. 805–811.
- "Mr. C.Th. Elout". Parlement.com (in Dutch).
