= Arnold Adriaan Buyskes =

Dutch naval officer

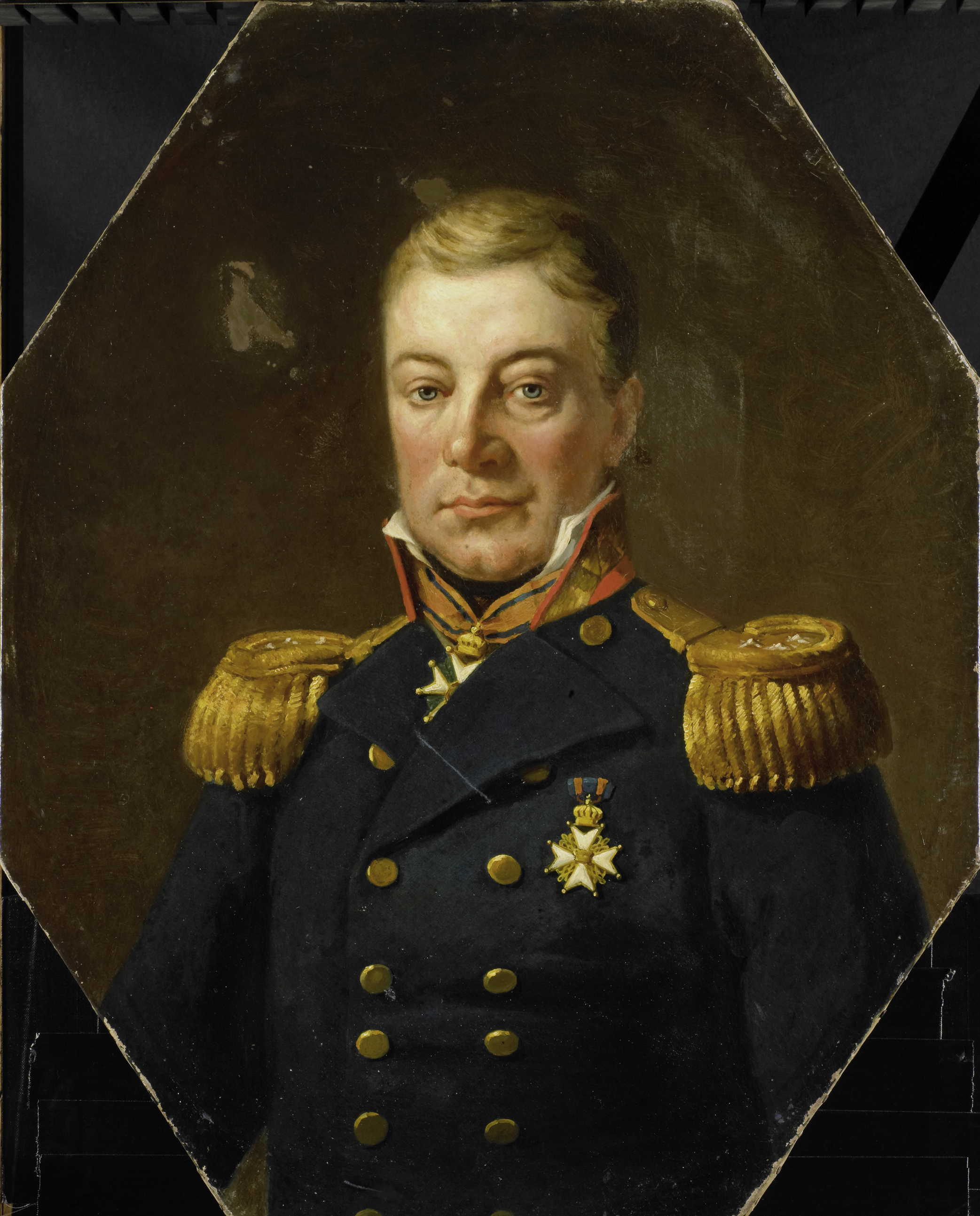
- Arnold Adriaan Buyskes
- Born: 21 January 1771; Enkhuizen, Dutch Republic
- Died: 23 January 1838 (aged 67); Loosduinen, Kingdom of the Netherlands
- Military career
- Allegiance: Dutch Republic; Batavian Republic; Kingdom of Holland; First French Empire; United Kingdom of the Netherlands
- Branch: Dutch States Navy; Batavian Navy; Navy of the Kingdom of Holland; French Imperial Navy; Royal Netherlands Navy
- Service years: 1783–1838
- Rank: Vice-Admiral
- Commands: Zeeland Flotilla; Zuiderzee Flotilla; Eendracht; Vlissingen Flotilla; Dutch East Indies Squadron
- Conflicts: War of the First Coalition; War of the Second Coalition; War of the Third Coalition; Napoleon's planned invasion of the United Kingdom; Battle of Blanc-Nez and Gris-Nez; War of the Fourth Coalition; War of the Fifth Coalition; War of the Sixth Coalition; Ambon Campaign (1817)
- Awards: Knight-Commander of the Military Order of William; Knight of the Order of the Dutch Lion
- Other work: lt. Governor-General of the Dutch East Indies (1807-1809); Commissioner-General of the Dutch East Indies (1816-1819)

Vice-Admiral Arnold Adriaan Buyskess (21 January 1771 – 23 January 1838) was a Dutch naval officer and colonial administrator who served as a Commissioner-General of the Dutch East Indies from 1816 to 1819. He also served as the lieutenant governor-general of Java from 1808 to 1809. Buyskess successfully led punitive expedition against native rebels in Maluku Islands in 1817.

== Life ==
=== Personal life ===
He was the son of Pieter Buyskes, mayor of Enkhuizen, and Arnoldina Adriana Jordens. He was on 9 February 1794 in Enkhuizen married to Eva Clasina van Romond. They had a son, Pieter.

=== Career ===
He became on 15 October 1783 a midshipman, 17 January 1788 lieutenant, left February 1789 to the Dutch East Indies, where he did hydrographic work, and became a first lieutenant in 1792.

He returned to the Netherlands on June 21, 1793. From 1793 to 1795 he served with the naval artillery corps in Elburg. After the founding of the Batavian Navy he was charged with surveying the seas and harbors of the Batavian Republic. He was promoted to captain-lieutenant in 1798, and was charged on June 8, 1798, with command of a division of gunboats on the Zeeland estuaries. In September 1799 appointed commander of the country's ships on the Zuiderzee and of the maritime defense of Amsterdam.

In that position he was ordered to block the approaches to the Texel to the Royal Navy at the occasion of the Vlieter incident, but failed to do so due to adverse weather.

On 27 February 1801 promoted to captain, he departed 3 January 1802 to the East Indies, commanding the frigate Eendracht, where the British handed control over the Maluku Islands to him after the Peace of Amiens on 30 September.

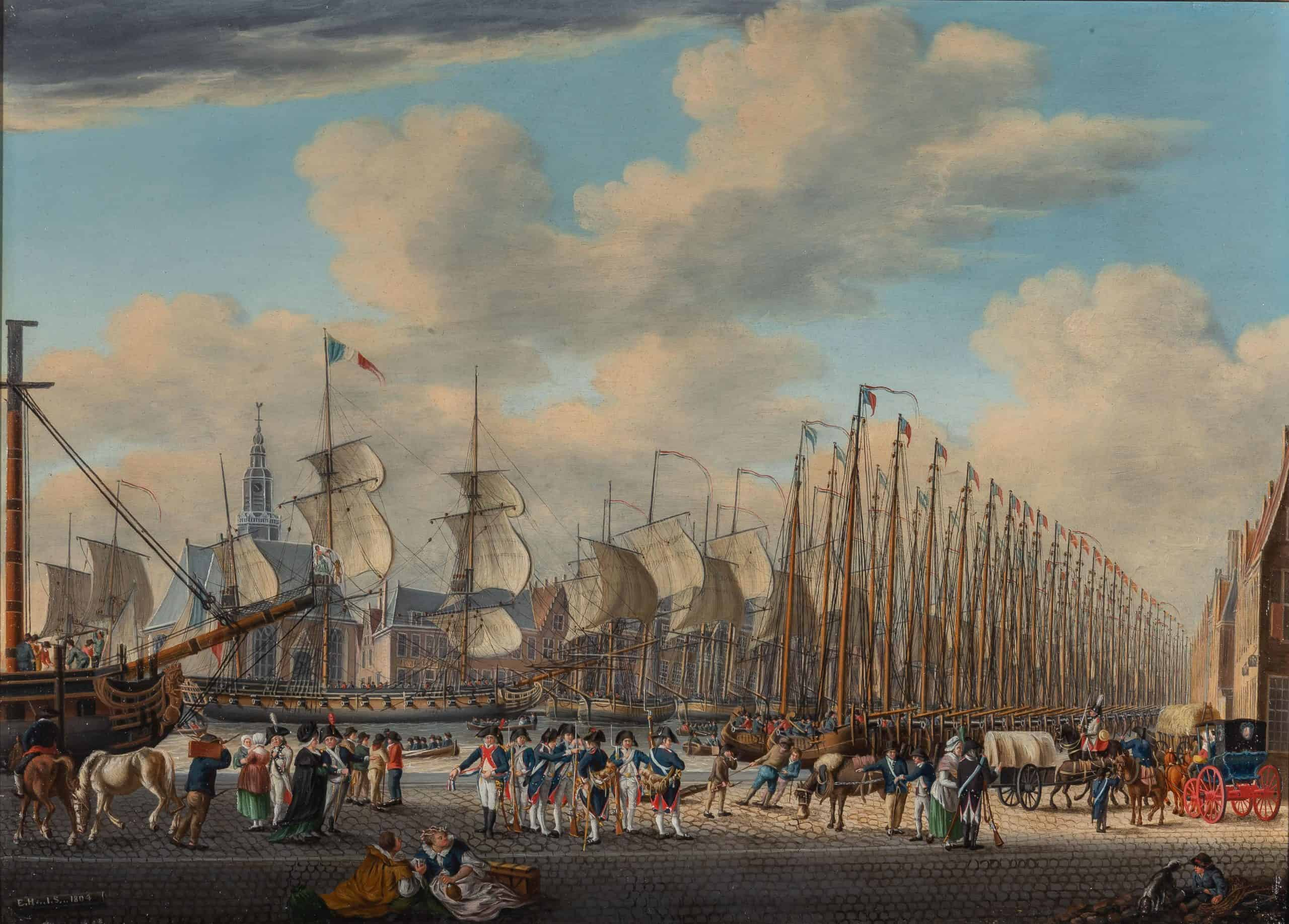
The Batavian Navy flotilla in Vlissingen, 1804

Returned to the Netherlands in 1804, he was appointed adjutant general on the Vlissingen flotilla. As such he took part in the Battle of Blanc-Nez and Gris-Nez on 17 July 1805 to the satisfaction of admiral Carel Hendrik Ver Huell, who praised his conduct.

On 4 January 1806 appointed adjutant general of Grand Pensionary Rutger Jan Schimmelpenninck, and 16 February 1807 (Note: The Batavian Republic had meanwhile been transformed into the Kingdom of Holland.) promoted to rear-admiral, (Note: In those days the rank of Commandeur did not yet exist in the Dutch navy.) and appointed aide de camp of King Louis. On 17 May 1807 Buyskes was appointed Lieutenant-Governor-General of the Dutch East Indies, and was at the same time appointed commander of the Dutch naval squadron in the East Indies, under the newly appointed Governor-General Herman Willem Daendels. Both left the Netherlands under assumed names on different neutral ships within a week of each other. But Daendels made the voyage much faster. Daendels arrived in Batavia on April 10, 1808, after having made the journey by way of New York, and relieved Governor-General Albertus Henricus Wiese. Buyskes on the other hand took almost three months longer. He was appointed by Daendels as vice-president of the Council of the Dutch East Indies, and charged with command of the troops belonging to the military district of Batavia.

When Buyskes arrived in the Dutch East Indies, the squadron he was supposed to command had been all but destroyed by the Royal Navy in the Java campaign of 1806–1807. The few warships still in Dutch hands had deteriorated beyond repair, and as no new ships arrived from Holland, Buyskes ordered several small warships to be built and organised into flotillas in order secure trade and combat piracy. On 6 December 1808 Buyskes accepted command of the naval and army forces in Surabaya, where Fort Lodewijk was built on Madura Strait under his supervision. In October 1809 he was granted leave to return to the Netherlands "for health reasons". (Note: Van der Aa suggests that the true reason was a conflict with Daendels)

Along with his adjutant, he boarded the snow Havik, under the command of Lieutenant J. Steelingh and armed with six 3-pounder guns and two 1-pounder swivel guns, with which Buyskes made the return voyage to Europe. On 10 February 1810, she was attacked near Bermuda by the British schooner HMS Thistle, which was armed with two 6-pounder guns and eight 12-pounder carronades. After a fierce fight, in which Buyskes was shot in the left thigh, Havik struck her colors. Buyskes was taken as a prisoner to Halifax, Nova Scotia, where he remained until October 30, 1810, when he was exchanged.

In January 1811 he arrived in Paris where he learned of the French annexation of Holland and also that he had been created baron of the kingdom of Holland by King Louis, with an endowment, which appointment and endowment, however, were not carried out because of the annexation to France. After a leave to recover his health, Buyskes left in September, 1813 to Paris to take command of a division of the fleet lying at Toulon, but as his wound was not quite healed, remained in Paris until 12 April 1814, when he returned to the Netherlands.

Buyskes went over to the navy of the newly created Sovereign Principality of the United Netherlands and was appointed rear-admiral. In September, 1814 he was ordered to command a squadron destined for the East Indies. On 20 November 1814 Buyskes together with Cornelis Theodorus Elout and Godert van der Capellen, was appointed Commissioners-General of the Dutch East Indies with orders to take over the administration of this colony from the British. However, due to the events of the Hundred Days, the voyage was delayed, so that Buyskes first left on 29 November 1815, when they sailed from the Texel in his squadron of 7 vessels. They arrived on the roadstead of Batavia on 26 April 1816, but only on 19 August the government was taken over from the British governor.

In July, 1817, an insurrection, led by Pattimura, broke out on the island of Saparua in the Moluccas. Buyskes was tasked by his fellow-commissioner Van der Capellen, acting as Governor-General, to restore order in the area. He mounted the expedition with the ships of the line Zr. Ms. Prins Frederik, Zr. Ms. Admiraal Evertsen, and Zr. Ms. Nassau with a detachment of soldiers from the Indies Brigade on board. They first visited the Sultan of Ternate, a Dutch vassal, who supplied about 1500 auxiliary troops, together with the Sultan of Tidore, another vassal. With Ambon Island as base of operations he mounted landings on Haruku Island and Saparua, after first having cleared the north coast of Ambon from insurgents. The fights were often brutal. On Haruku, in the village of Pelauw, a unit under the command of major Meijer committed an atrocity by the summary execution or 23 captured notables. Buyskes later took responsibility for this act, by stating in his report on the expedition that he himself had ordered the execution. (Note: This is unlikely, as he was not personally present. But he may have taken the responsibility, because at the time he wrote the report major Meijer had already died "a hero's death", in the Dutch view, on Saparua.)

The campaign ended with several other executions of sometimes doubtful legality (although Pattimura himself was tried and convicted for the murders of the Resident of Saparua and his family, and hanged on 16 December 1817). Buyskes received the Knight-Commander of the Military Order of William for his leadership of the campaign.

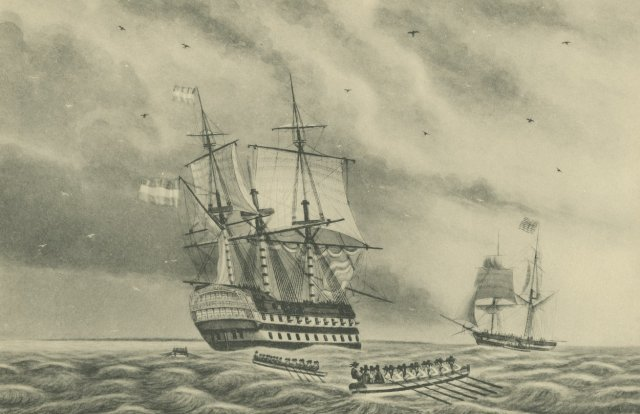
Zr. Ms. Admiraal Evertsen near Diego Garcia, by Q.M.R. Ver Huell (Note: In the background the American brig Pickering.)

When at the end of 1818 the mission of the Commissioners-General had been successfully completed, Buyskes returned to the Netherlands together with Elout on board the Admiraal Evertsen, but was shipwrecked off the island of Diego Garcia; the crew were rescued by the American brig Pickering, who transported them to Mauritius, where they were able to board the British merchant ship Cadmus for the voyage home.

After his return he served on various committees and in various positions. In July 1827 he was promoted to vice admiral.

He was Knight in the Order of the Dutch Lion; He was also a member of the Utrecht provincial Society of Arts and Sciences. Buyskes died on 23 January 1838 at his estate Valkenbosch near Loosduinen.

== Sources ==
- Aa, A. J. van der, ed. (1855). "Arnold Adriaan Buyskes". Biografisch Woordenboek der Nederlanden. Deel 2. Derde en vierde stuk (DBNL) (in Dutch). pp. 1674–1676.
- Blok, P.J.; Molhuysen, P.C., eds. (1911). "Arnold Adriaan Buyskes". Nieuw Nederlandsch biografisch woordenboek (DNBL) (in Dutch). Sijthoff. pp. 527–529.
- Kemp, P.H. van der (1912). "Het herstel van het Nederlandsch gezag in de Molukken in 1817, naar oorspronkelijke stukken. DERDE GEDEELTE. De bedwinging van den opstand in de Molukken door schout-bij-nacht Buijskes". Bijdragen tot de Taal-, Land- en Volkenkunde van Nederlandsch-Indië (in Dutch). 66 (1): 1, 3–167. JSTOR 20769637.
