= F. L. Anthing =

Frederik Lodewijk Anthing (1820–1883) was one of the Dutch evangelists evangelising in Java in the 19th century. He gave his attention toward evangelising the indigenous people to the community along with the other evangelists such as Kiai Ibrahim Tunggul Wulung, Kiai Sadrach, Paul Tosari, and others. Anthing spread Christianity to the people of Java.

== Life and education ==
Anthing was born in Batavia (modern-day Jakarta) on 1820 and died on 1883 in a tram accident. His father was Dutch and his mother German. He earned his degree in law in the Netherlands. He earned the title Meester in de Rechten (Mr.). After finishing his studies, he worked at the Semarang district court since late 1850s. Then, around 1863, Anthing moved to Batavia and worked as the district court vice deputy. After retiring, Anthing fully focuses on evangelising. He paid for his expenses out of his own pocket. Due to his limitations, he went to the Netherlands to seek aid from sympathisers.

== Evangelism ==
=== In Semarang ===
When working in the Semarang district court, Anthing had already shown interest in evangelism. He followed pietism. His interest and attention were more focused on the indigenous population. They grew stronger when the indigenous evangelist Ibrahim Tunggul Wulung met him. He started evangelising in Semarang and recruited some Javanese Christians to be trained as evangelists.

When transferred to the Batavia district court, he did not stop his evangelising. He joined the evangelical association Genootschap voor In-en Uitwendige Zending. This association was established by some white Batavians who want to take up evangelism. However, he did not participate in the association for long and eventually stepped down from the membership, so his evangelism was done personally rather than as a part of an organisation.

In his Batavian home, he trained indigenous youths from West Java, Central Java, East Java, and Sulawesi to become evangelists working in various regions. Anthing trained 50 evangelists who would work in various regions of the Dutch East Indies. However, the Dutch East Indies government prohibited evangelising in western Java. The reason given was that the people there were devout Muslims, and evangelising there might cause disturbances to peace and order. The government eventually permitted evangelising in western Java on 1873.
