= Verstegen =

Verstegen is a Dutch toponymic surname. Notable people with the surname include:

- Lyda Verstegen, Dutch lawyer and activist
- Mark Verstegen, American businessman
- Mike Verstegen (born 1971), American football player
- Willem Verstegen (1612–1659), Dutch explorer and merchant
- Richard Verstegan (Rowlands) (c. 1550–1640), Anglo-Dutch antiquary
- Ute Verstegen (born 1970), German archaeologist
- Willem Verstegen (1612–1659), Dutch explorer and merchant; chief trader of the factory in Dejima
- Spencer Verstegen (1995-), Digital marketer and traveler

== See also ==
- Versteeg
