= List of Westerners who visited Japan before 1868 =

This list contains notable Europeans and Americans who visited Japan before the Meiji Restoration. The name of each individual is followed by the year of the first visit, the country of origin, and a brief explanation.

== 16th century ==
- António da Mota and Francisco Zeimoto and possibly António Peixoto (1543, Portugal) The first Europeans, Portuguese navigators, to land on the island of Tanegashima also credited for introducing the matchlock arquebus, cannons and gunpower.
- Fernão Mendes Pinto (1543, Portugal) Visited Japan and claimed to have introduced guns to the Japanese, though the account is almost certainly untrue.
- Francis Xavier (1549, Spain (on Portuguese mission)) The first Roman Catholic missionary who brought Christianity to Japan.
- Cosme de Torres (1549, Spain) A Spanish Jesuit (on Portuguese mission) who successfully converted Ōmura Sumitada to Christianity – the first Christian daimyō.
- Luis de Almeida (1552, Portugal) A Portuguese Jesuit who established the first western hospital in Japan and negotiated the opening of the port of Yokoseura to Portuguese traders.
- Gaspar Vilela (1556, Portugal). A Portuguese Jesuit who, in a departure from Xavier's methods, learned the Japanese language and talked directly with daimyos, opening the center of Japan to the mission.
- Melchior Nunes Barreto (1556, Portugal) established the first Jesuit library in Kyushu, Japan around 1556.
- Luís Fróis (1563, Portugal) A Jesuit who befriended Oda Nobunaga and published the account later. His record still serves as an important resource for Japanese historians.
- Gnecchi-Soldo Organtino (1570, Italy) An Italian missionary with the Society of Jesus.
- João Rodrigues (1577, Portugal) A Portuguese Jesuit priest who carried out missionary work in Japan and served as an interpreter for both Toyotomi Hideyoshi and Tokugawa Ieyasu. Rodrigues is also known for authoring notable works on Japanese culture and language.
- Alessandro Valignano (1579, Italy) An Italian Jesuit priest and missionary who helped supervise the introduction of Catholicism to the Far East, and especially to Japan.
- Francesco Pasio (1583, Italy) Italian missionary of the Society of Jesus who worked in a number of places in East Asia
- Giovanni Niccolò (1583, Italy) A Jesuit Italian painter who was sent to Japan to found a seminary of painting, named the Seminary of Painters.
- Luis de Cerqueira (1592, Portugal) A Jesuit priest and missionary from Portugal, who became the Bishop of Funai in the late 16th century.
- Pedro Martins (bishop) (1596, Portugal) Jesuit prelate of the Catholic Church and later Bishop of Funai.
- Francesco Carletti (1597, Italy) A merchant and slave trader from Florence who stopped in Japan during his circumnavigation of the globe.
- William Adams (1600, England) The first Englishman to reach Japan. Among the first Westerners to become a samurai, under Shōgun Tokugawa Ieyasu.
- Jan Joosten van Lodensteyn (1600, Dutch Republic) Adams' shipmate, also among the first Westerners to become a samurai, who became an advisor for the shōgun. He is remembered in Japan (based on their variation of his name) in the Yaesu area of Tokyo and as Yaesu on one exit of the Tokyo Station.

== 17th century ==
- Jerome de Angelis (1603, Italy) missionary to Japan beatified in 1867.
- Sebastião Veira (1604, Portugal) missionary of the Society of Jesus in Japan.
- Francisco Pacheco (1604, Portugal) A Jesuit missionary and martyr in Japan.
- Wojciech Męciński (1604, Poland) A Catholic Jesuit missionary, widely believed to be the first Pole to visit south-eastern Asia.
- Joam Mattheus Adami (1604, Italy) Jesuit who did missionary Work in Japan before exiling to Macau.
- Diogo de Carvalho (1609, Portugal) was a Jesuit missionary martyred in Edo period, Japan.
- Cristóvão Ferreira (1609, Portugal) A Jesuit missionary who committed apostasy after being tortured in the anti-Christian purges of Japan. His apostasy is the main subject of the novel Silence by Shūsaku Endō.
- Luis Sotelo (1609, Spain) A Franciscan friar who proselytized in the Tōhoku region of Japan with the help of Daimyo Date Masamune. He was executed after re-entering Japan illegally in 1624.
- John Saris (1613, England) Captain of the English ship Clove, who met with shōgun Tokugawa Ieyasu to establish a trading post in Japan.
- André Palmeiro, ecclesiastical visitor of the Asian missions of the Jesuits
- Camillus Costanzo (1622, Italy) Italian Roman Catholic Jesuit missionary in Japan, burned alive in 1622, as a martyr.
- Martin Lubreras (1632, Spain) A Roman Catholic missionary beatified by Pope John Paul II.
- Nicolaes Couckebacker (1633, Dutch Republic) VOC Opperhoofd (chief Dutch trader/agent) in Hirado, who assisted the government in 1638 to suppress Japanese Christian rebels led by Amakusa Shirō.
- Guillaume Courtet (1636, France) A French Dominican friar, Catholic priest, and missionary. The first Frenchman to have visited Japan.
- Marcello Mastrilli (1637, Italy) Jesuit missionary who was martyred in Japan on Mount Unzen during the Tokugawa Shogunate.
- Giuseppe Chiara (1643, Italy) Entered Japan at a time when Christianity was strictly forbidden in an attempt to locate fellow priest Cristóvão Ferreira who had apostatized his Christian faith at the hands of torture by the Japanese authorities in 1633. Chiara was also tortured and eventually became an apostate as well.
- Engelbert Kaempfer (1690, Holy Roman Empire) A German naturalist and physician. His descriptions in History of Japan (posthumously published in English in 1727) became the chief source of Western knowledge about the country for nearly two centuries.
- Giovanni Battista Sidotti (1700, Italy) An Italian Jesuit priest who entered Japan illegally and was arrested. His communication with the scholar Arai Hakuseki resulted in the book Seiyō Kibun.

== 18th century ==
- Robert Janson (1704, Ireland), a native of Waterford seized off the coast of Kyushu and brought to Dejima Island.
- Martin Spanberg (Russia, born in Denmark) visited the island of Honshu in 1738, being in command of the first Russian naval squadron specifically sent to seek for a diplomatic encounter with the Japanese. The Russians landed in a scenic area which is now part of the Rikuchu Kaigan National Park. Despite the prevalent policy of sakoku, the sailors were treated with politeness if not friendliness.
- Isaac Titsingh (1779–1784) A Dutch East India Company ("VOC") Opperhoofd at Dejima in Nagasaki Bay.
- Adam Laxman (1792, Russia) Son and representative of Finnish-born researcher Eric Laxman, led a Russian expedition to Hokkaido, ostensibly to return Daikokuya Kōdayū to Japan.
- Carl Peter Thunberg (1775, Sweden) A Swedish naturalist who came as a surgeon on a Dutch East India Company ("VOC") ship. He was a follower of Carl Linnaeus whose scientific activities resulted in the first detailed description of the flora and fauna of Japan.
- Hendrik Doeff (1799, Dutch Republic) former Dutch East India Company ("VOC") Opperhoofd (Chief Officer) who maintained the Dutch nationality of Dejima even after Napoleon conquered the Netherlands. He presided over the Dutch East India Company ("VOC") during the Phaeton incident.

== 19th century ==
- Nikolai Rezanov (1804, Russia) A Russian diplomat who stayed in Nagasaki for 6 months. He was commissioned by Alexander I as Russian ambassador to Japan to conclude a commercial treaty, but his efforts were thwarted by the Japanese government.
- Vasily Golovnin, Fedor Mur, Andrey Khlebnikov with the crew (1811, Russia) – Russian navigators who were held captive for two years on the island of Hokkaido. Golovnin's book, Captivity in Japan During the Years 1811, 1812, 1813, was widely read by Europeans. Khlebnikov's mémoires left unpublished.
- Titia Bergsma was a Dutch woman who visited Dejima Island, Japan, in August 1817 with her husband, Jan Cock Blomhoff. She was believed to be the first Western woman to visit Japan.
- Johan Willem de Stürler (at least 1823-1826) Director of Dutch trading post at Dejima, Nagasaki.
- Philipp Franz von Siebold (1823, Netherlands/Germany) A German physician, botanist in Dutch service at Dejima, Nagasaki, who brought Western medicine to Japan. He was expelled from Japan after being accused as a spy (Siebold Incident).
- Heinrich Bürger (1825..1835, Netherlands/Germany), A German scientist in Dutch service who became a pharmacist and botanist on Dejima.
- Felice Beato (1863, Italy) An Italian photographer with British citizenship who recorded many rare views of Edo Period Japan.
- Edoardo Chiossone (1833, Italy) An Italian engraver and painter, noted for his work as a foreign advisor to Meiji period Japan, and for his collection of Japanese art. He designed the first Japanese bank notes.
- Mercator Cooper (1845, United States) First formal American visit to Edo (now Tokyo), Japan.
- Ranald MacDonald (1848, Scottish-Canadian), The first native English-speaker to teach English in Japan, who taught Einosuke Moriyama, one of the chief interpreters to handle the negotiations between Commodore Perry and the Tokugawa shogunate.
- Matthew C. Perry (1853, United States) A Commodore of the U.S. Navy who landed with 250 sailors in 1853 and opened Japan to the West in 1854.
- Townsend Harris (1855, United States) The first United States Consul-General to Japan, and first Western diplomat to meet directly with the Shogun.
- Henry Heusken (1855, United States) A Dutch-American interpreter for the American consulate and Harris's secretary, who was assassinated by anti-foreigner rōnin. His diary was published as Japan Journal, 1855–1861.
- Friedrich August von Lühdorf (1855-6), supercargo on the American ship Greta. Became the first foreigner to conduct trade in Hakodate.
- José Luis Ceacero Inguanzo (1855, Spain) Spanish Captain in Manila, Philippines. He was named samurai by the lord of Chikuzen. Advisor to the Meiji Government.
- Dirk de Graeff van Polsbroek (1857, Netherlands) aristocrat, merchant and diplomat. He was Dutch Consul General and Minister-Resident and due to his relationship with Emperor Meiji he laid the foundation for modern diplomatic representation in Japan of various European States.
- Rutherford Alcock (1859, United Kingdom) The first British diplomatic representative to live in Japan. His book, The Capital of the Tycoon, became one of the first books to describe Edo period Japan systematically.
- James Curtis Hepburn (1859, United States) An American physician, educator and Christian missionary who is known for the Hepburn romanization system, enabling westerners to read and write Japanese in Roman script.
- Thomas Blake Glover (1859, Scotland) A Scottish merchant who supported the anti-Edo government militant Satchō Alliance. His residence in Nagasaki still remains as a museum (Glover Garden).
- Frederik Blekman (1859, Amsterdam / Holland) reached Nagasaki on 16 April 1859 via Jakarta. Translator and impresario.
- James Hamilton Ballagh (1861, United States) American missionary who lived in Yokohama.
- Margaret Tate Kinnear Ballagh (1861, United States) An American missionary who lived in Yokohama. Her account Glimpses Of Old Japan, 1861–1866 is the only book written by a Western woman staying in Edo period Japan.
- Nicholas of Japan (1861, Russia) A Russian Orthodox priest, monk, archbishop and saint who introduced the Eastern Orthodox Church to Japan.
- Charles Wirgman (1861, United Kingdom) An English artist and cartoonist, the creator of Japan Punch which was the first magazine in Japan.
- Charles Lennox Richardson (1862, United Kingdom) A British merchant who was murdered by samurai in the Namamugi Incident which later led to the Bombardment of Kagoshima.
- Ernest Mason Satow (1862, United Kingdom) A British diplomat who assisted the negotiations during the Bombardment of Kagoshima, and kept a diary of his career in Japan.
- Aimé Humbert (1863, Switzerland) A Swiss politician who established a treaty with Japan and later published Japan and the Japanese Illustrates, which captured many detailed scenes of Edo period Japan.
- François Perregaux (1863, Switzerland) The first watchmaker in Japan.
- James Favre-Brandt (1863, Switzerland) Took part in the first Swiss diplomatic mission to Japan.
- Heinrich Schliemann (1865, Germany) An archaeologist who stayed in Japan for two months.
- Algernon Bertram Mitford (1866, United Kingdom) A British aristocrat, diplomat and writer who traveled in Japan and wrote Tales of Old Japan (1871).
- Jules Brunet (1867, France) A French military officer who served the Tokugawa shogunate during the Boshin War in Japan.

== See also ==
- Christianity in Japan
- Convention of Kanagawa
- Dejima
- Dutch East India Company
- Dutch missions to Edo
- Empire of Japan–Russian Empire relations
- History of Roman Catholicism in Japan
- Japan–United Kingdom relations
- Nagasaki
- Nanban trade
- Portuguese Nagasaki
- Sakoku
- VOC Opperhoofden in Japan
