= Versteeg =

Versteeg is a Dutch toponymic surname. It is a contraction of "van der steeg", meaning "from the alley/path". De Steeg has also been the name of a number of farms and localities. Variations on this name include Versteegen, Versteegh, Versteegt, Verstege, Verstegen and Versteghe. People with these names include:

Versteeg

- Bryan Versteeg (born c.1975), Canadian conceptual artist
- Dave Versteeg (born 1976), Dutch short track speed skater and coach
- Gerard Versteeg (1876–1943), Dutch physician and explorer
- Gerrit Versteeg (1872–1938), Dutch architect
- Gerrit Versteeg (born 1958), Dutch enterprise architect
- Heinz Versteeg (1939–2009), Dutch football striker
- Kelly Versteeg (born 1994), Dutch tennis player
- Kris Versteeg (born 1986), Canadian ice hockey winger
- Marcel Versteeg (born 1965), Dutch long-distance runner
- Marlon Versteeg (born 1997), Dutch football forward
- Menno Versteeg, Canadian indie rock singer
- Mitch Versteeg (born 1988), Canadian ice hockey defenceman

Versteegen

- Niek Versteegen (born 1994), Dutch football forward

Versteegh

- Kees Versteegh (born 1947), Dutch orientalist and linguist
- Frank Versteegh (born 1954), Dutch air racer
- Pierre Versteegh (1888–1942), Dutch horse rider
- Willem Versteegh (1886–1975), First Royal Netherlands Air Force pilot

Versteegt

- Hans Versteegt (1928–2011), Dutch organ builder
- Mandy Versteegt (born 1990), Dutch football forward

Verstegen

- Lyda Verstegen (born 1930s), Dutch lawyer and activist
- Mark Verstegen (born 1969), American businessman
- Mike Verstegen (born 1971), American football player
- Richard Verstegen (ca.1550–1640), Anglo-Dutch antiquary, poet, and polemic
- Sanne Verstegen (born 1985), Dutch middle-distance runner
- Ute Verstegen (born 1970), German archaeologist
- Willem Verstegen (1612–1659), Dutch explorer and merchant; chief trader of the factory in Dejima
