= Versteegh =

Versteegh is a Dutch surname. Notable people with the surname include:

- Jan Versteegh (born 1985), Dutch television presenter and singer
- Kees Versteegh (born 1947), Dutch linguist
- Frank Versteegh (born 1954), Dutch air racer
- Pierre Versteegh (1888–1942), Dutch horse rider

== See also ==
- Versteeg
