= Petronella Muns =

Dutch politician, wet nurse (1794–1842)

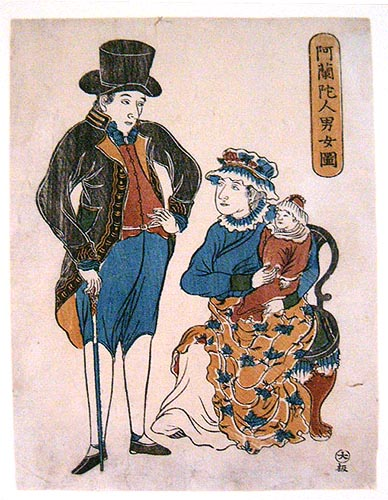
Japanese print depicting Petronella Muns and her employer Jan Cock Blomhoff. Petronella is holding Blomhoff's son.

Petronella Muns (21 January 1794, The Hague – 13 May 1842, The Hague) was one of the first Western women to set foot in Japan.

She was the servant of Titia Bergsma, the wife of Jan Cock Blomhoff, and wet nurse to the Blomhoffs' infant son. Blomhoff was appointed governor of the Dutch trade station on Deshima (in Nagasaki) and took the two women there despite a Japanese ban on the presence of western women. Bergsma and Muns arrived on 16 August 1817 and were forced to leave after five weeks. On the return journey to the Netherlands, Muns gave birth to a daughter.

Muns and Bergsma had aroused considerable attention during their short stay and were portrayed by Japanese artists. Statues and images of them are still sold in the Japanese tourist industry, where they are remembered as the first western women in Japan.
