= Dutch missions to Edo =

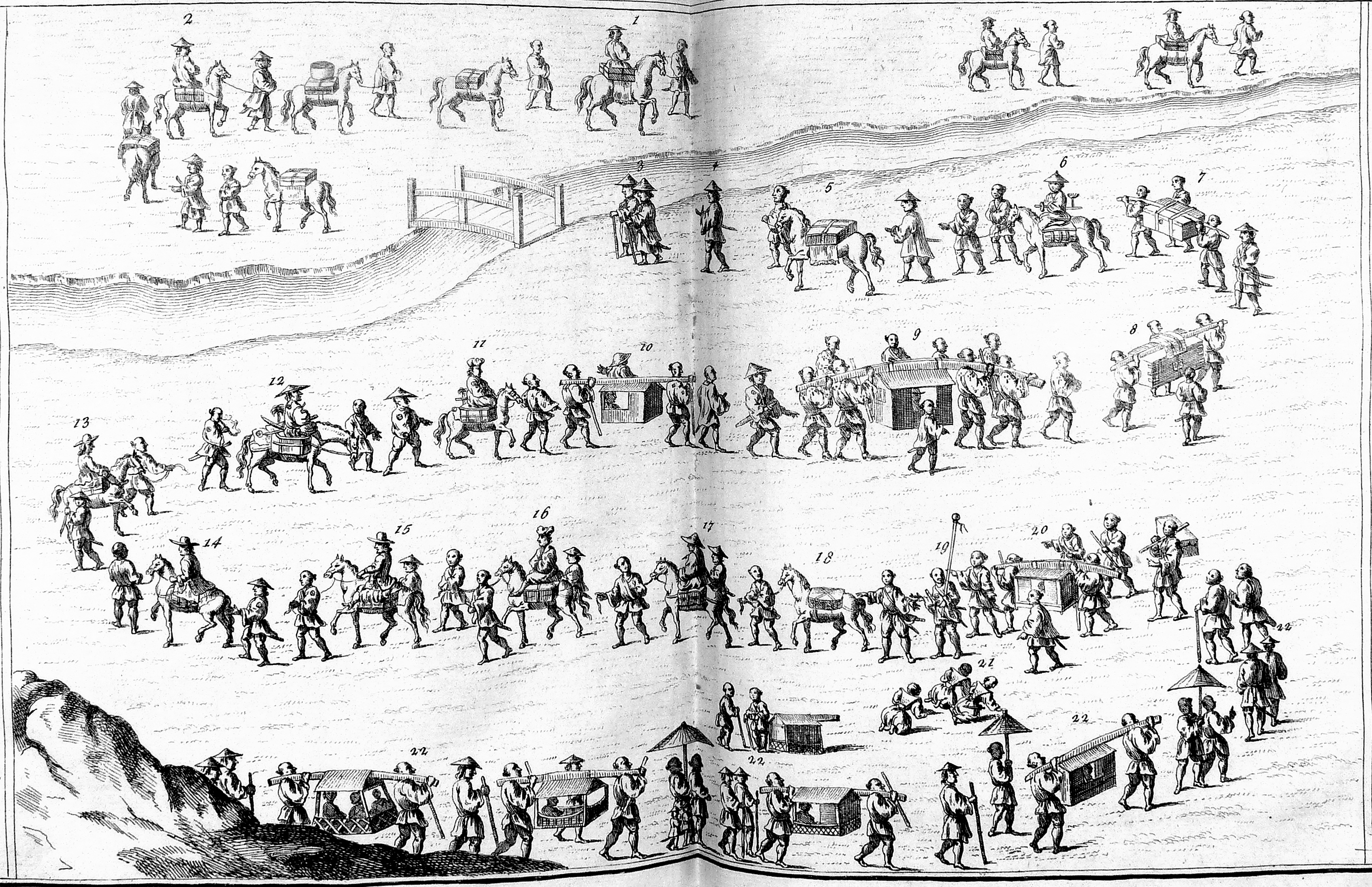
The Dutch procession to the shōgun's court. An 18th-century European engraving depicting a Dutch tributary embassy to the Tokugawa's castle.

The Dutch East India Company missions to Edo were regular tribute missions to the court of the Tokugawa shōgun in Edo (modern Tokyo) to reassure the ties between the bakufu and the opperhoofd. The opperhoofd of the Dutch factory in Dejima and his attendants were escorted by the Japanese to Edo, where they presented exotic and elaborate gifts to the shōgun: clocks, telescopes, medicines, artillery and rare animals were usual gifts of the tribute missions. The shōgun would correspond at the same time with gifts to the Dutch. The tribute system, as in China, served to enhance the idea of the shōgun's supremacy to his subjects.

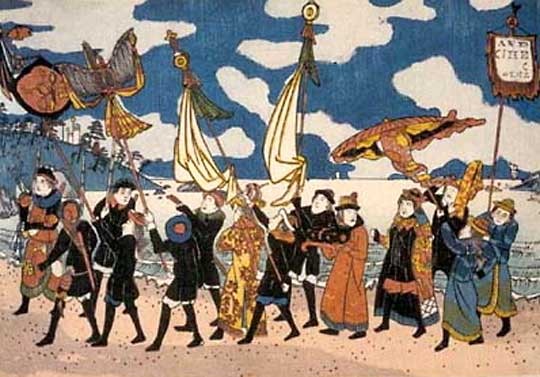
A 19th-century Japanese ukiyo-e print depicting a Dutch embassy. Due to their proximity to Edo, the Dutch were required to make more visits to the capital than a more distant vassal such as Ryukyu.

== See also ==
- Sankin-kōtai
- Japan–Netherlands relations
- VOC opperhoofden in Japan
- List of Westerners who visited Japan before 1868
