= Francesco Pasio =

Jesuit missionary in Asia (1554–1612)

- 巴範濟
- Born: 1554; Bologna, Papal States
- Died: 30 August 1612; Macao, China
- Citizenship: Italian
- Occupation: Jesuit missionary
- Organization: Society of Jesus
- Known for: Missions in Japan and China

Francesco Pasio (Chinese: 巴範濟 Ba Fanji, born November or December 1554 in Bologna in the Papal States, died 30 August 1612 in Macao in China) was a missionary of the Society of Jesus who worked in a number of places in East Asia. He was among the first Jesuits in China, but is best known for his work in Japan.

Originally, he asked to be sent as a missionary to Ethiopia, but was instead assigned to the East. He arrived in Goa on 13 September 1578, in Malacca in June 1582, and in Macao on 7 August of the same year. He was originally meant to go directly to Japan, but this plan was changed at the last moment. He was sent into China as a companion to Father Michele Ruggieri and arrived in Zhaoqing on 27 December 1582. There he assisted with the instruction of candidates for baptism. After a few months, he was expelled.

His superior, Father Alessandro Valignano, then asked him to travel after all to Nagasaki in Japan. He arrived there on 25 July 1583 and worked there for many years. He served as vice-provincial of the Jesuits' China–Japan Province from 1600 to 1611. On 31 July 1611, when news arrived that the leadership of the Society of Jesus had divided China and Japan into separate provinces, Father Pasio became the first provincial there.

As early as 22 March 1612, Father Valentin Carvalho S.J. took over as provincial, and Father Pasio travelled to Macao. He arrived in early April and died a few months later, on 30 August 1612, in Macao.

== See also ==
- Alessandro Valignano
- List of Westerners who visited Japan before 1868
- History of the Catholic Church in Japan
