= Hendrik Doeff =

Dutch diplomat and Japanologist

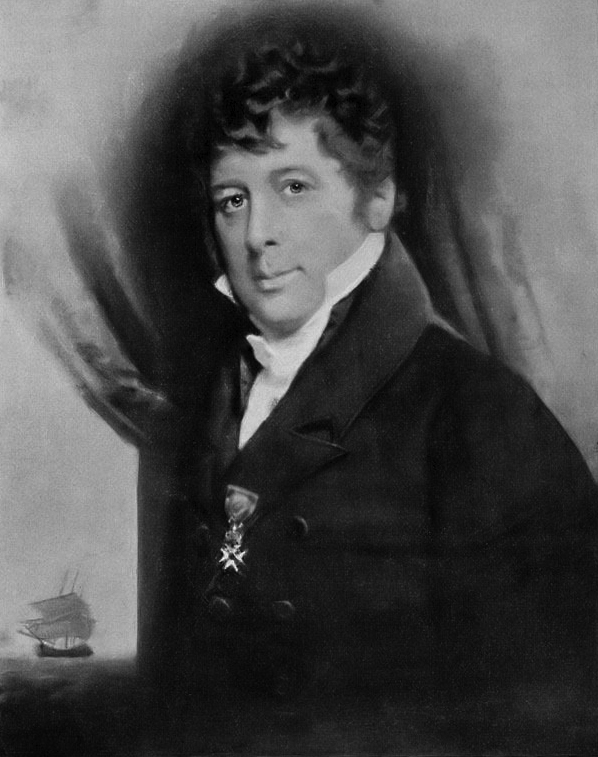
- Portrait by Charles Howard Hodges, c. 1817–1822

Opperhoofd of Dejima trading post
- In office 14 November 1803 – 6 December 1817
- Monarchs: Louis I (1806–1810); Louis II (1810); William I (from 1813)
- Preceded by: Willem Wardenaar
- Succeeded by: Jan Cock Blomhoff

Personal details
- Born: 2 December 1777 Amsterdam, Dutch Republic
- Died: 19 October 1835 (aged 57) Amsterdam, Netherlands

Hendrik Doeff (2 December 1777 – 19 October 1835) was the Dutch commissioner in the Dejima trading post in Nagasaki, Japan, during the first years of the 19th century. During the Napoleonic Wars (1803–1815), in which the Netherlands was occupied by (and a satellite of) France, Dutch ships abstained from sailing to Japan directly due to the possibility of being captured by Royal Navy ships. They relied on "neutral" American and Danish ships. The Netherlands was annexed by Napoleon Bonaparte (1810–1813), while Britain captured several Dutch colonial possessions and after the 1811 invasion of Java, Dejima was the only place in the world where the Dutch flag still flew, as ordered by commissioner Hendrik Doeff.

== Biography ==
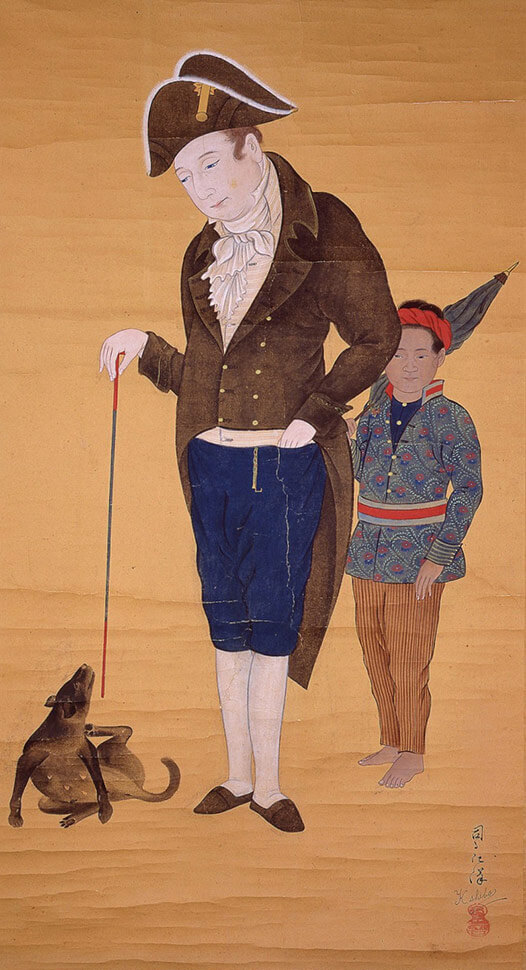
Japanese painting of Doeff and a Balinese slave in Dejima

Doeff was born in Amsterdam. As a young man, he sailed to Japan as a scribe for the Dutch East India Company. He became chief of the Dejima post in 1803, succeeding Willem Wardenaar, who was Director from 1800 to 1803. Doeff remained in Japan until 1817, when Jan Cock Blomhoff succeeded him. After Britain captured the Dutch East Indies in 1811, Dejima became the only place in the world flying the Dutch flag. The Netherlands was restored in 1814, and Doeff was later decorated for his loyalty and courage.

Doeff wrote a Dutch-Japanese dictionary, and a memoir of his experiences in Japan, titled Recollections of Japan. He was notable for his strong activity in maintaining the Dutch trade monopoly in Japan. He is the first westerner known to have written haiku, two of which have been found in Japanese publications from the period of his stay in Japan. One of his haiku:

イナヅマ ノ
Inadsma no

カヒナ ヲ カラン
Kaÿna Wo karan

クサ マクラ
Koesa Makura.

lend me your arms,
fast as thunderbolts,
for a pillow on my journey

== The Phaeton incident ==
After the French had annexed the Batavian Republic in 1806 and Napoleon I had begun to use its resources against Great Britain, Royal Navy ships started to capture Dutch merchant shipping. In 1808, HMS Phaeton, under the command of Captain Fleetwood Pellew, entered Nagasaki's harbour to ambush some Dutch trading ships that were expected to arrive shortly.

The Phaeton entered the harbour on 14 October surreptitiously under a Dutch flag. As was the custom, Dutch representatives from Dejima rowed out to welcome the visiting ship, but as they approached, Phaeton lowered a tender to capture the Dutch representatives, while their Japanese escorts jumped into the sea and swam back to land. The Phaeton, holding the Dutch representatives hostage, demanded supplies (water, food, fuel) be delivered to her in exchange for their return. Because the harbor cannon defenses were both old and poorly maintained, the meager Japanese forces in Nagasaki were seriously outgunned and unable to intervene.

At the time, it was the Saga clan's turn to uphold the policy of sakoku in Nagasaki, but they had economized by stationing only 100 troops there, instead of the 1,000 men officially required for the station. The Nagasaki Magistrate, Matsudaira Genpei, immediately ordered troops from Kyūshū. The Japanese mobilized a force of 8,000 samurai and 40 ships to confront the Phaeton, but it would take them a few days to arrive. In the meantime, the Nagasaki Magistrate provided supplies to the British, and the Dutch representatives were released.

The Phaeton left two days later on 17 October, before the arrival of Japanese reinforcements, and after the crew had learned the Dutch trading ships would not be coming that year. They also left a letter for Doeff. The Nagasaki Magistrate, Matsudaira, took responsibility by committing suicide by seppuku. Following Phaeton's visit, the Bakufu reinforced coastal defenses and promulgated a law prohibiting foreigners coming ashore, on penalty of death (1825–1842, Muninen-uchikowashi-rei). The Bakufu also requested that official interpreters learn English and Russian, departing from their prior focus on Dutch studies. In 1814, the Dutch interpreter Motoki Shozaemon produced the first English-Japanese dictionary (6,000 words).

== Works ==
- Recollections of Japan, Hendrik Doeff, ISBN 1-55395-849-7

== In popular culture ==
- The eponymous character in the novel The Thousand Autumns of Jacob de Zoet is loosely based on Hendrik Doeff.

== See also ==
- VOC Opperhoofden in Japan
- List of Westerners who visited Japan before 1868
- Sakoku
