= EXOS =

American athletics company

Exos
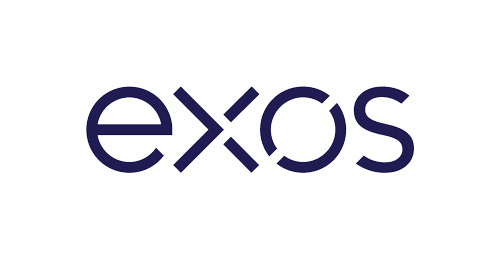
- Formerly: Athletes' Performance
- Company type: Private
- Founded: 1999; 27 years ago
- Founder: Mark Verstegen
- Headquarters: Phoenix, Arizona
- Number of locations: 66 (2018)
- Areas served: 21 US states

Exos is an American company founded in 1999. Exos is described as a science-driven performance company. In 2014, Exos acquired Medifit Corporate Services, which staffs corporate wellness centers nationwide. The company was founded by Mark Verstegen in 1999 and based in Phoenix, Arizona. it has private training facilities in:

- Phoenix, Arizona
- Fieldhouse USA in Frisco, Texas
- StubHub Center in Carson, California
- the SKLZ headquarters in Carlsbad, California
- the Andrews Institute in Gulf Breeze, Florida

The company offers training and nutrition services in Raleigh, North Carolina and Cary, North Carolina through a partnership with Raleigh Orthopedic Clinic.

EXOS Human Capital LLC is a private personalized performance training institute, with an estimated 1001 to 5000 employees and $100-$500 million annual revenue. Their primary competitors include Plus One Health Management, Health Fitness, and Aquila LTD.

== History ==
=== 1999–2000: Founding and incorporation ===
EXOS was founded as Athletes' Performance, Inc. in Tempe, Arizona in 1999 by Mark Verstegen. The same year, the company formed a partnership with Adidas.

=== 2001–2008 ===
The API Tempe, Arizona facility opened in 2001, and that same year API began an NFL Combine preparation program for prospective NFL athletes, training them for the NFL Combine tests.

In 2003, API opened a second facility in Carson, California, primarily for soccer, tennis, cycling, and track and field athletes

In 2004, EXOS founder, Mark Verstegen, released his first book "Core Performance". The next year, the company started a relationship with the Germany national football team in preparation for the 2006 World Cup. In 2006, the company began working with the United States Military. The company launched CPRO and CPESD products in 2008 and entered an innovation and development partnership with adidas miCoach. From inception until 2008, more than 25 first round picks were API athletes, including 8 each in the 2005 and 2006 NFL Drafts.

In 2007, a fourth facility was added in Gulf Breeze, Florida, to focus on rehabilitative and performance services.

=== 2009–2017 ===
In 2009, the Core Performance brand opened the first Corporate Performance Center with Google, which had been previously contracted and staffed by Plus One Heath Management and then by Medifit Corporate Service prior. The company was named Fast Company "Most Innovative Company in Sports" in 2011, while the EXOS Training Center in AZ was ranked 4 among the top 10 MOST LUDICROUSLY EXPENSIVE GYMS. In 2012, EXOS supported training for 60 London Olympic Medalists, including 24 gold medal winners. The same year, EXOS trained 14 NFL 1st round draft picks and supported the LA Galaxy soccer team back to back MLS Cup wins.

On December 18, 2014 EXOS acquired MediFit Corporate Services Inc.

On April 20, 2017 EXOS extended their partnership with Adidas.
