= Titia Bergsma =

First European woman to stay in Japan while sealed off for Europeans

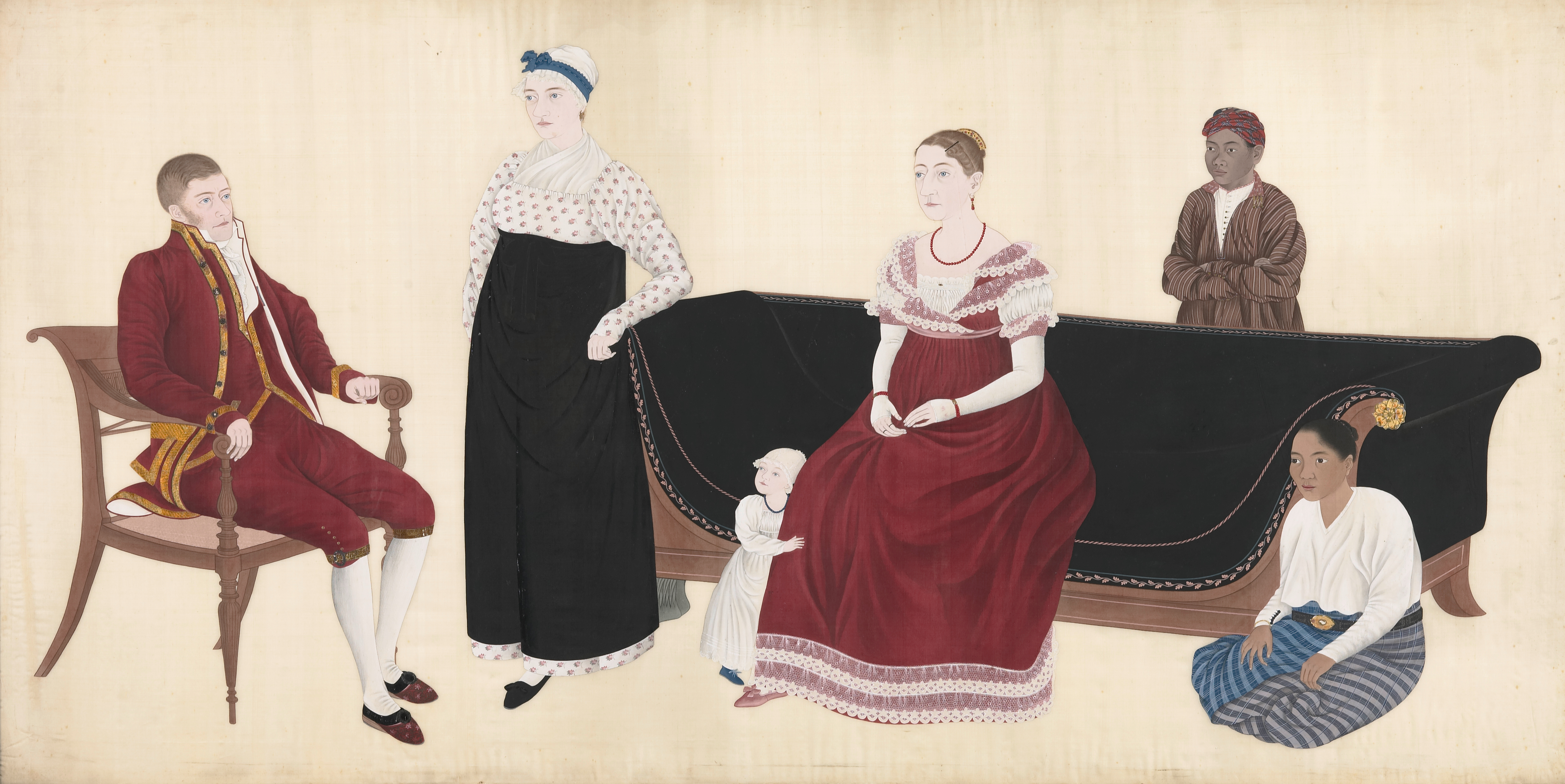
Jan Cock Blomhoff and his red-haired wife Titia Bergsma (seated), their infant son Jantje, the wetnurse Petronella Muns (standing), the Indonesian maid Marathy, and a Javanese servant boy (behind sofa). Japanese print drawn by Kawahara Keiga, circa 1817.

Titia Bergsma (Leeuwarden, 13 February 1786 – The Hague, 2 April 1821) was a Dutch woman who visited Dejima Island, Japan, in August 1817 with her husband, Jan Cock Blomhoff. She was believed to be the first Western woman to visit Japan.

Under the Tokugawa shogunate's sakoku policy Japan was extremely secluded. The Dutch and Chinese were allowed to visit the country, but only for trade, and no women were permitted. The governor of Nagasaki allowed Bergsma to enter the island. Five weeks later when the shōgun Tokugawa Ienari became aware of her presence, he ordered that Titia and the wetnurse Petronella Muns had to leave. In December the women went back to Batavia and Holland and Bergsma never saw her husband again. In the meanwhile, Japanese painters and sculptors had made 500 images of Bergsma. Her images had such popularity in Japan that they outsold all other prints in 19th century Japan. Images can be found all over Japan. There are companies which specialise entirely in Bergsma images. Her face can be seen on millions of pieces of Japanese porcelain.

The life of Bergsma has been adapted to animation in Japan.

== Gallery ==
Depictions of Titia Bergsma
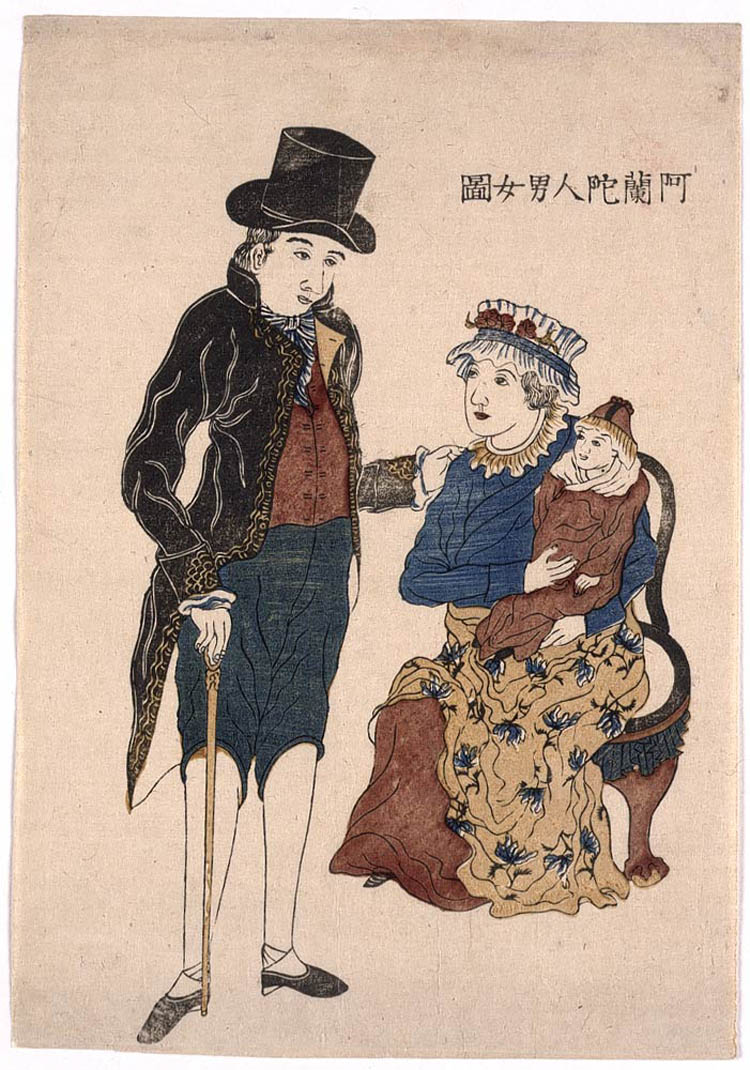
Japanese print featuring Jan Cock Blomhoff, Titia Bergsma, their small son Johannes and nurse Petronella Munts.

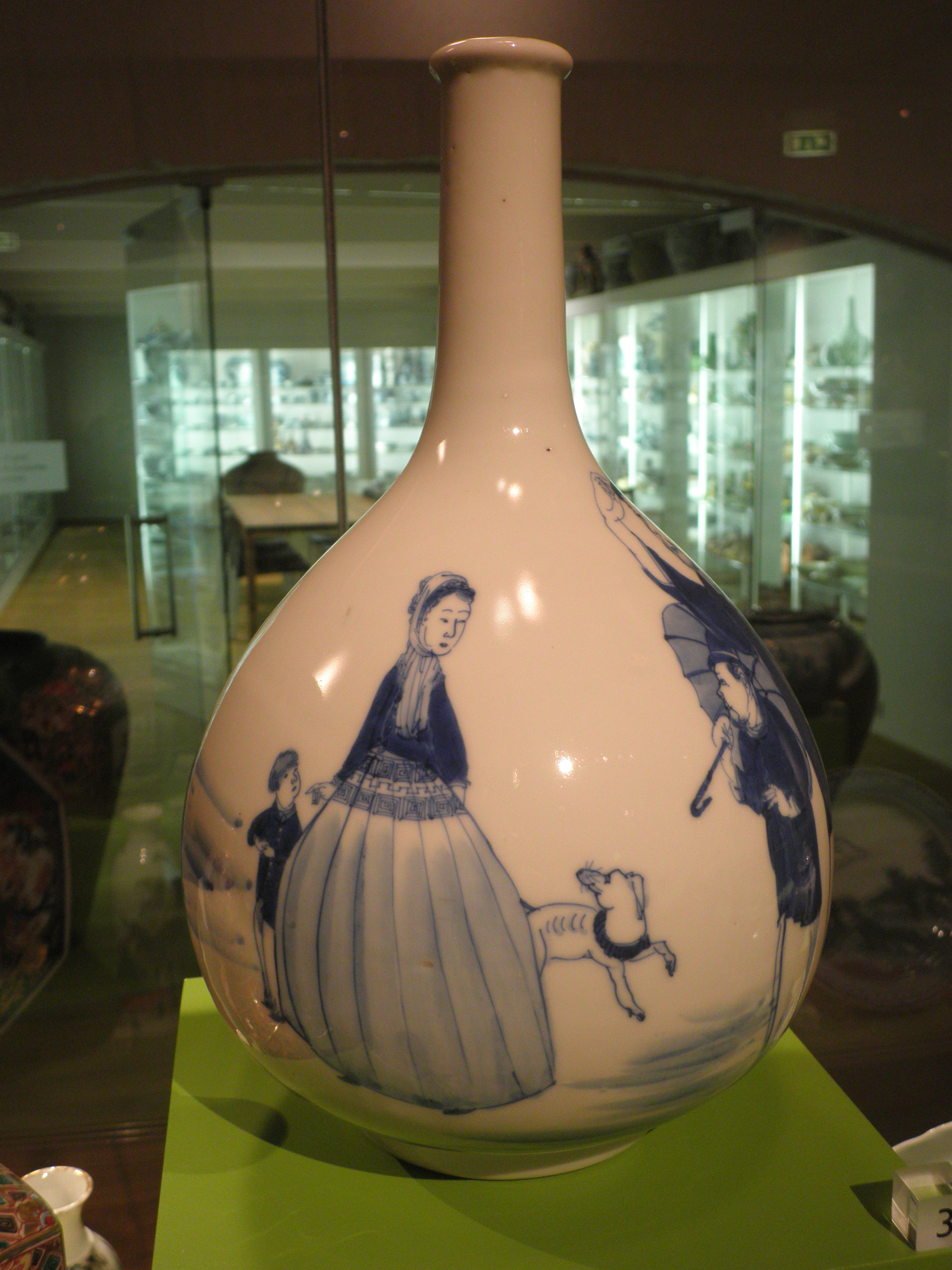
Titia Bergsma and family depicted on a Japanese vase

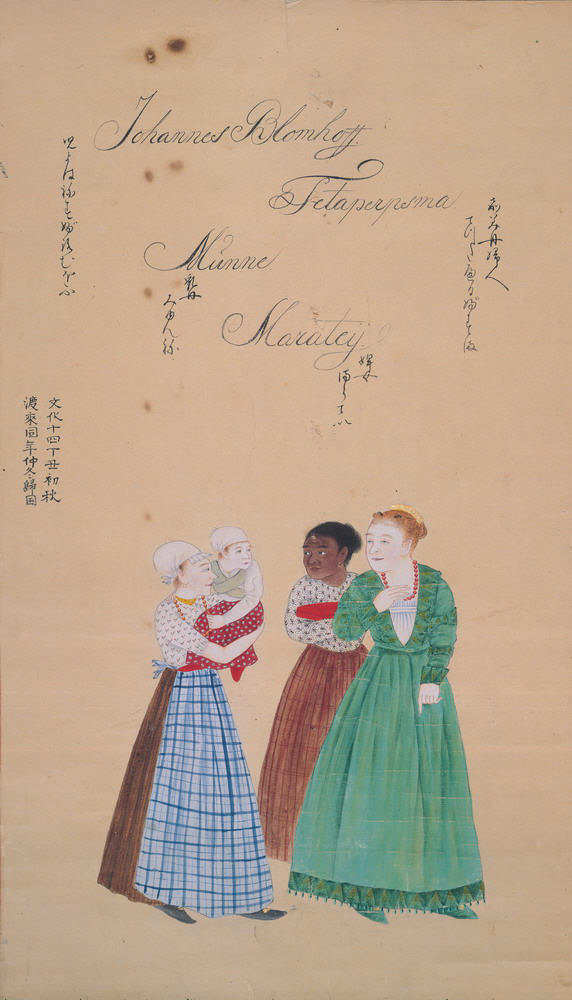
Scroll painting with Titia Cock Blomhoff, the servant Marateij, the son Johannes Blomhoff and the nurse Petronella Muns

== See also ==
- Nagasaki-e – genre of art about foreign women during Tokugawa era

== Sources ==
- R. P. Bersma, Titia. The first Western Woman in Japan (Amsterdam 2002)
- Jolien C. Hemmes en Ennius H. Bergsma, Brieven uit Deshima, met het complete, originele verslag over de reis naar Japan van Jan Cock Blomhoff en Titia Bergsma met hun zoontje, plus 100 oude afbeeldingen, eerste druk 2017, tweede druk 2021, © JCH, ISBNnr: 9789090349473, NUR: 691, www.brievenuitdeshima.nl (Publication with the original manuscript about the trip with his wife and son written by the father of Titia, using her letters to her parents.)
