= Jan Cock Blomhoff =

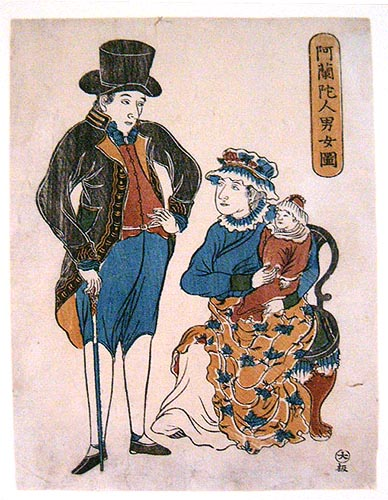
Jan Cock Blomhoff, director ("opperhoofd") of Dejima, the Dutch trading colony in the harbour of Nagasaki, Japan, with his little son Johannes in the arms of Petronella Muns, a Dutch nurse-maid (anonymous Japanese artist).

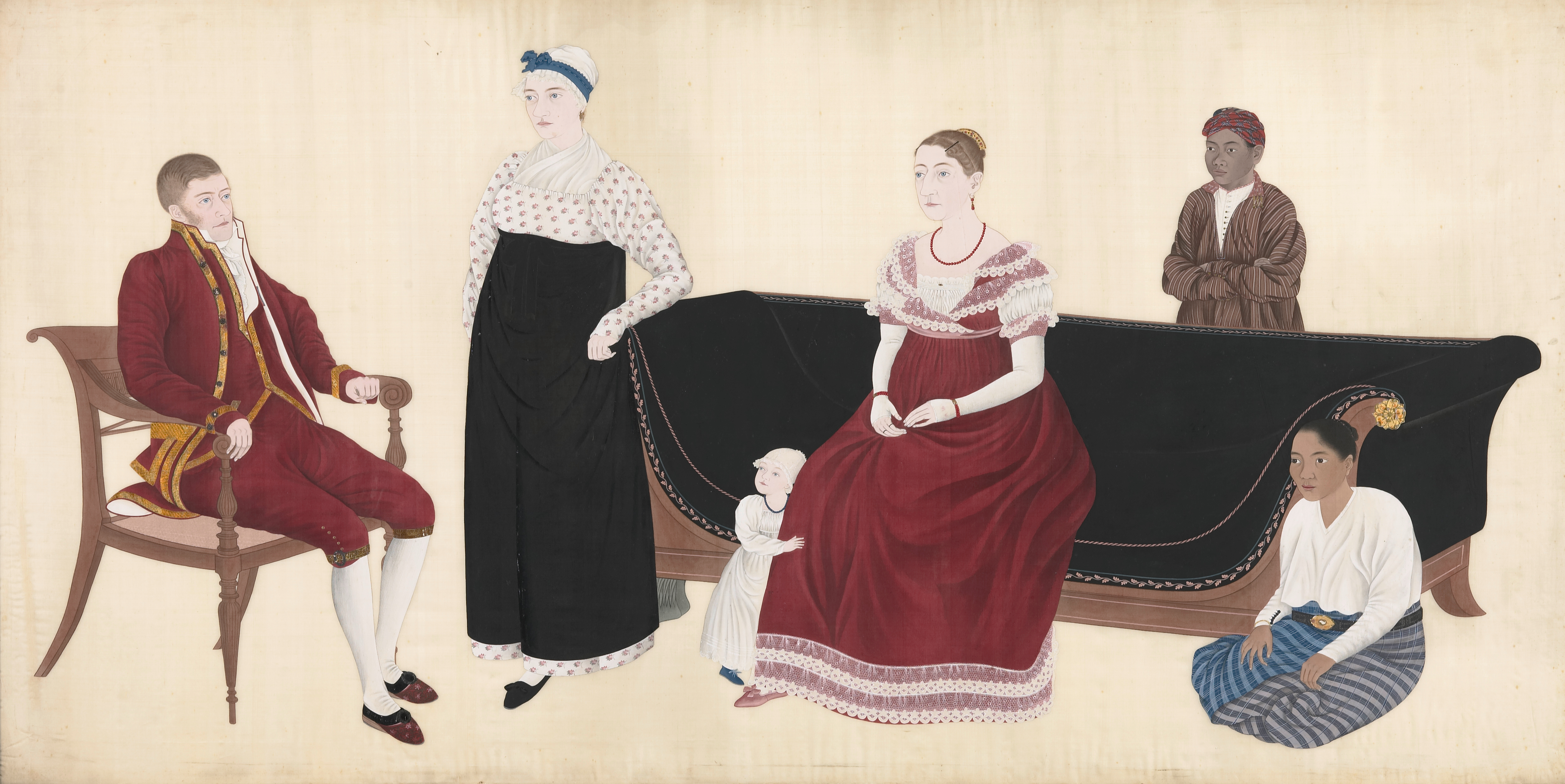
Jan Cock Blomhoff and his red-haired wife Titia Bergsma (seated), their infant son Jantje, the wetnurse Petronella Muns(standing), the Indonesian maid Marathy, and a Javanese servant boy (behind sofa). Japanese print drawn by Kawahara Keiga, circa 1817.

Jan Cock Blomhoff (Amsterdam, 5 August 1779 – Amersfoort, 15 August 1853) was director ("opperhoofd") of Dejima, the Dutch trading colony in the harbour of Nagasaki, Japan, 1817–1824, succeeding Hendrik Doeff.

During his first stay on the island (1809–1813) he had an affair with a Japanese woman and the couple had a child, who died in 1813.

When he arrived in Dejima for the second time in August 1817 he was accompanied by his wife Titia Bergsma, whom he had married in 1815; his son Johannes; Petronella Muns, a Dutch wetnurse; and an Indonesian maid. The ladies and the little boy were not allowed to stay. In the short time they stayed there, till December 1817, they were often drawn by artists, who had never seen other than Japanese women, and 500 different prints widely circulated throughout the country.

Blomhoff is commemorated in the specific name of an Asiatic pit viper, Gloydius blomhoffii.

In Japan he is well known for his support for making the first English dictionary for Japanese, which is Angeriagorintaisei.

Blomhoff was succeeded as director of Dejima by Johan Willem de Stürler in 1823.

== See also ==
- Dutch East India Company
- VOC chief traders in Japan
