= Johan Willem de Stürler =

Dutch colonel

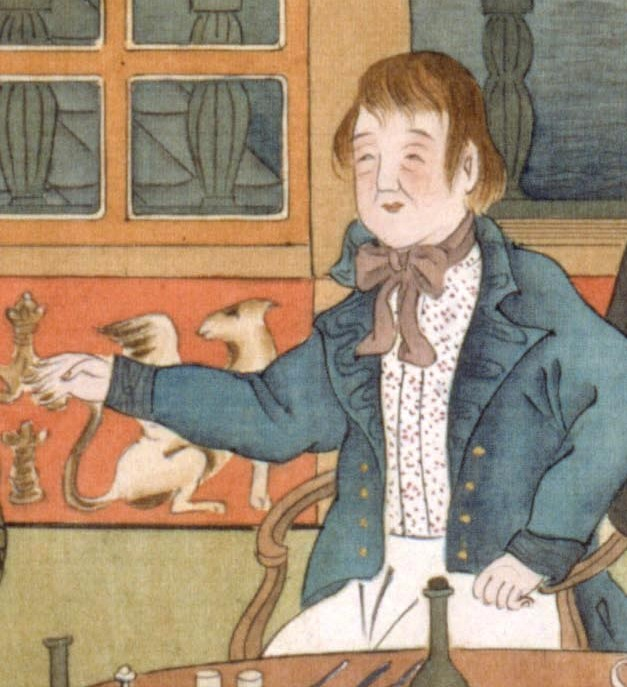
- Kawahara Keiga: Trading post director Johan Willem de Stürler, 8 October 1825. Detail from "Big party".
- Born: December 7, 1774; Sittard
- Died: January 9, 1855 (aged 80); Paris
- Other name: Johan Willem de Sturler
- Military career
- Commands: Director of the Dutch trading post at Dejima, Nagasaki, Japan

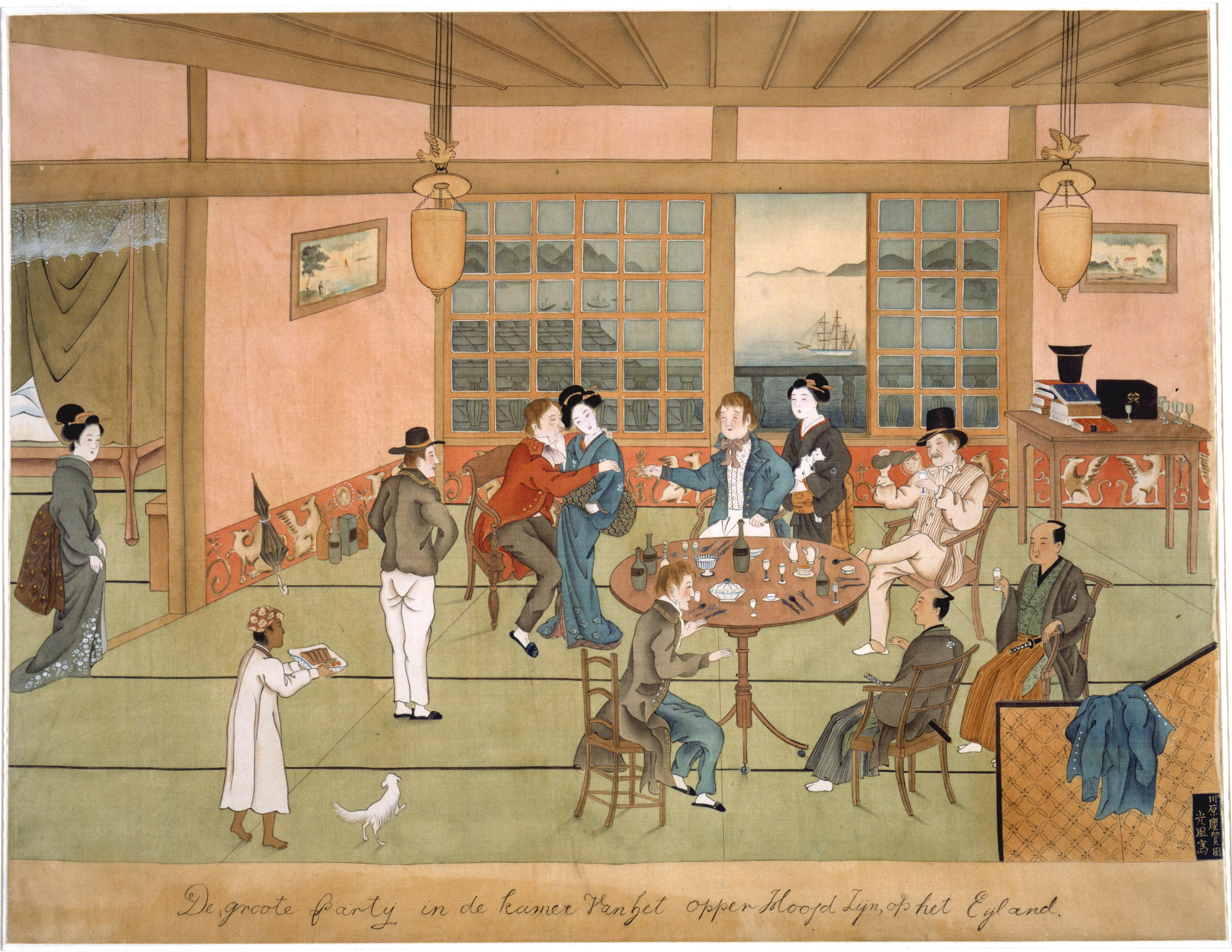
Kawahara Keiga: "Big party". Trading post director Johan Willem de Stürler (center) and company in his residence at Desjima, Nagasaki, Japan, 8 October 1825, as a delayed celebration of the birthday of King William I. Philipp Franz von Siebold is sitting center left. The young westerner in front is Johan Willem's son, Jacques Edouard (Eduard) de Stürler.

Johan Willem de Stürler (also Johan Wilhelm de Sturler, Jean Guillaume de Sturler and Jean Guillaume de Stürler, Sittard, 7 December 1774 - Paris, 9 January 1855) was a Dutch colonel and director of the Dutch trading post at Dejima, Nagasaki, Japan.

== Biography ==
Johan Willem de Sturler was born into the Dutch nobility of the De Stürler family from Switzerland, as a son of Johan Rudolf de Stürler (1723-1823) and Agnes Suzanne Soeterik (1746-1823). He had been a tax inspector before entering military service in the Dutch army as an artillery captain. In 1797 de Sturler married Sybille Elisabeth van Biesen (1774-1807) at Tiel, the Netherlands, who gave him four children. In 1815 he went with his family to Batavia in the Dutch East Indies (present day Jakarta in Indonesia).

From 20 November 1823 up to 5 August 1826 he was director (Dutch: opperhoofd) of the Dutch trading post on the island Dejima at Nagasaki, Japan, as a successor to Jan Cock Blomhoff. In 1826 he participated in the tribute mission to the court of the Tokugawa shōgun in Edo (modern Tokyo) to reassure the ties between the shogunate and the opperhoofd. During the mission he was accompanied by the physician Philipp Franz von Siebold (1796-1866). The travel from Dejima to Edo lasted almost two months. They were carried in a 'norimono' for the most part over land. De Sturler visited the Shogun at his palace in Edo in May 1826. In August 1826 he left the island and went back to Batavia. He died in Paris in 1855 and was buried at the Montmartre Cemetery.

== Role in art history ==
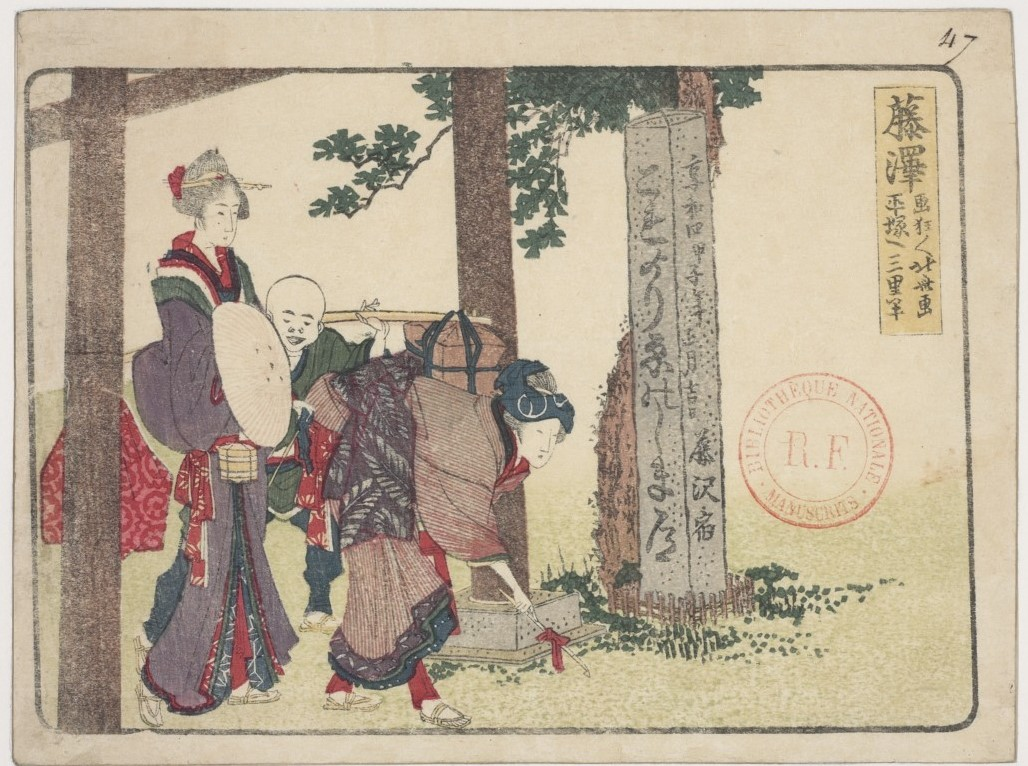
Katsushika Hokusai: Tôkaidô gojûsan tsugi, before 1827. Sturler Collection, Bibliothèque nationale de France.

Sturler was instrumental in bringing work by Japanese painter Katsushika Hokusai (1760-1849) to Europe which had been commissioned by Jan Cock Blomhoff. The Bibliotheque Nationale in Paris still retains this collection. At first Siebold did not want to pay Hokusai the full agreed price, but Stürler protested and paid in full.

== Literature ==
- de Stürler, Adam Emanuel Carolus (1863). Généalogische aanteekeningen van de familie de Stürler (in Dutch). Roermond: J.J. Romen. OCLC 82525440. Page 70 scan on J.W. de Stürler, page 71 continued scan.
