= Pierre Versteegh =

Dutch equestrian

Olympic medal record

Men's Equestrian
| Bronze medal – third place | 1928 Amsterdam | Team dressage |

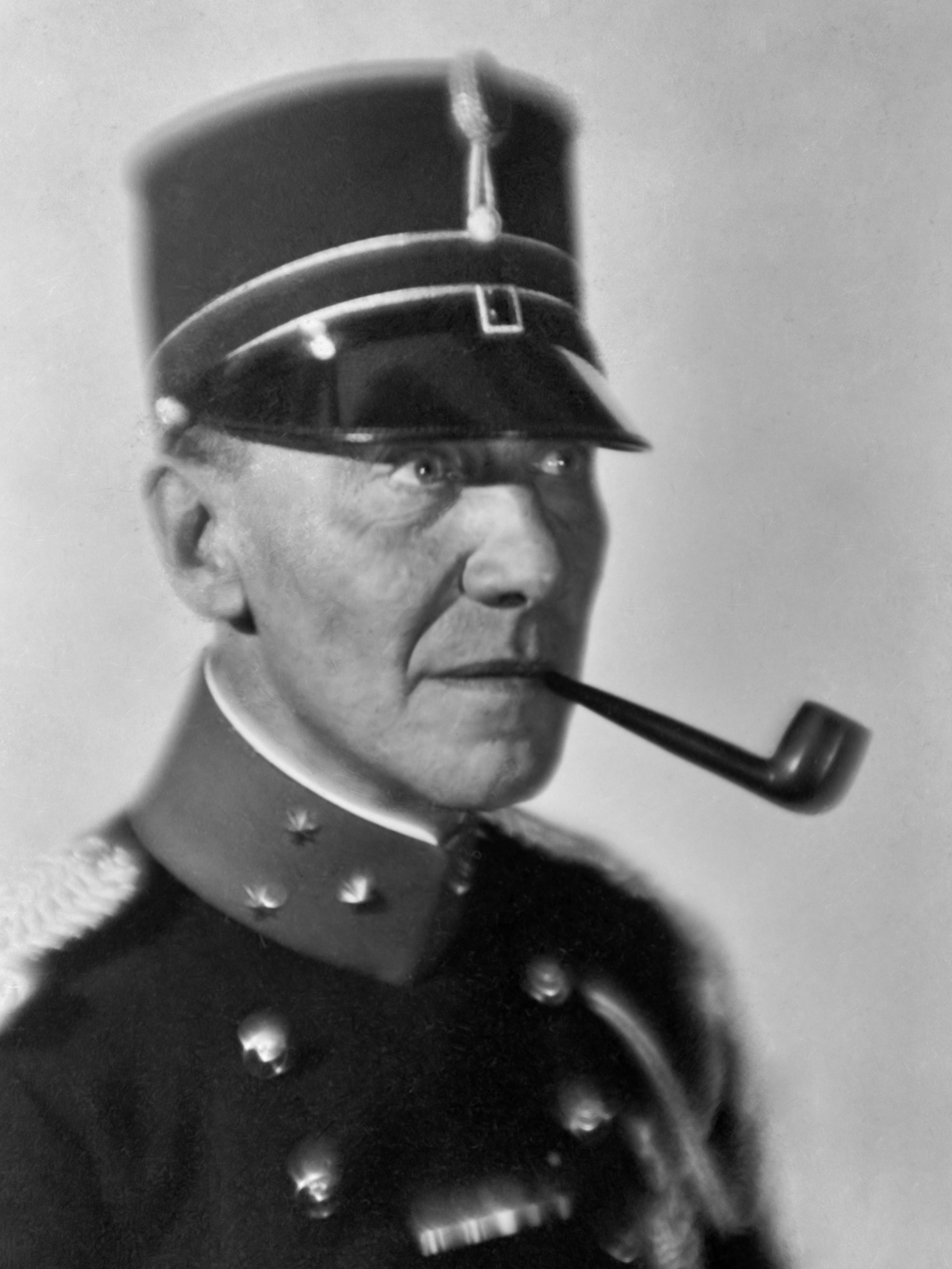
P.M.R. Versteegh (1935)

Pierre Marie Robert Versteegh (June 6, 1888 in Kedoeng Banteng, Sragen, Dutch East Indies – May 3, 1942 in Sachsenhausen concentration camp) was a Dutch horse rider who competed in the 1928 Summer Olympics and in the 1936 Summer Olympics.

In the 1928 Summer Olympics he won the bronze medal in the team dressage with his horse His Excellence after finishing ninth in the individual dressage.

Eight years later he finished fifth with the Dutch team in the team dressage and placed eighth in the individual dressage.

The Kdo Oranienburg executed him by firing squad. Versteegh is one of 95 people who, most posthumously, received the Dutch Cross of Resistance after World War II.
