= Mark Verstegen =

Mark Verstegen is the President and Founder of EXOS. He serves as the Director of Performance for the NFL Players Association, and, introduced by Jürgen Klinsmann in 2004, is an athletic coach for the Germany national football team. He also set a Guinness World Record with Sheraton Hotels for the World's Largest Resistance Band Strength Training Class.

He directs a team of performance, nutrition and rehabilitation specialists to train athletes including 2010 NFL #1 Draft Pick Sam Bradford and the last 5 #1 NFL Draft Picks, the Germany national football team, USA Men's National Team, Everton F.C. and the MLS's Los Angeles Galaxy, Chivas USA and Sporting Kansas City; baseball's Justin Morneau, Brian Roberts and Evan Longoria; NFL players Mike Karney, Max Starks, Terrell Thomas; hockey players Chris Drury and Angela Ruggiero; and NBA players Kevin Love and Caron Butler.

== Selected publications ==
- The Core Performance: The Revolutionary Workout Program to Transform Your Body & Your Life (2005) ISBN 1-59486-168-4
- Core Performance Essentials: The Revolutionary Nutrition and Exercise Plan Adapted for Everyday Use (2006) ISBN 978-1-59486-627-2
- Core Performance Endurance: A New Fitness and Nutrition Program That Revolutionizes the Way You Train for Endurance Sports (2006) ISBN 978-1-59486-352-3
- Core Performance Golf: The Revolutionary Training and Nutrition Program for Success On and Off the Course (2008) ISBN 978-1-59486-604-3
- Core Performance Women: Burn Fat and Build Lean Muscle (2009) ISBN 978-1-58333-362-4
- Every Day is a Game Day (2014) ISBN 978-1-58333-516-1
