= Ute Verstegen =

German christian archaeologist

Ute Verstegen (born 1970 in Stuttgart, Germany) is a German archaeologist. She is a professor for Christian Archaeology and Byzantine Art History at the University of Marburg.

== Life ==
Verstegen studied art history, classical archaeology, theatre, film and TV, and prehistory at University of Cologne, University of Bonn, and University of Barcelona from 1989 to 1998. She graduated as M.A. at University of Cologne in 1996 and received her Ph.D. in 1998 with the dissertation St. Gereon in Köln in römischer und frühmittelalterlicher Zeit (St Gereon in Cologne in Roman and early medieval times).

After she finished her studies, she worked at the University of Cologne as a postdoctoral researcher until 2004. From 2004 to 2013, she was an assistant professor for Christian Archaeology and Art History at the University of Erlangen-Nuremberg. With the winter semester 2013-14 she was appointed full professor for Christian Archaeology and Byzantine Art History at the University of Marburg.

== Publications ==
- Verstegen, Ute. Ausgrabungen und Bauforschungen in St. Gereon zu Köln. Mainz am Rhein: Philipp von Zabern, 2006.
