= List of governors of the Dutch East Indies =

This is a list of governors and colonial administrators of the Dutch East Indies. The majority of them were Governors-General appointed by the Dutch East India Company and later the Kingdom of the Netherlands. However, various British and French governors acted as governor during their respective occupations of the Dutch East Indies

First flag of the Dutch East India Company

Second flag of the Dutch East India Company

Flag of the Amsterdam Chamber of the Dutch East India Company

Flag of the Dutch East Indies

== History ==
When the Dutch East India Company set up a permanent settlement in Batavia, they appointed Pieter Both as Governor-General to oversee the trading outpost. The appointment of Governors-General by the Company continued until 1800 when they were declared bankrupt and their charter allowed to expire. All of their assets, including the Dutch East Indies, were nationalised and thus the Governor-General then became a Dutch Crown appointment. During the Napoleonic Wars, the Dutch East Indies came under French and later British occupation with them appointing respective governors until 1816 when the Dutch resumed control and appointed their own Governor-General again.

The Dutch continued to appoint governors until the Second World War when the Japanese invaded and occupied the Dutch East Indies. The Governor-General at the time, Alidius Tjarda van Starkenborgh Stachouwer surrendered the Dutch East Indies to Japanese control in 1942. He would be asked by the Queen to resume his position as Governor after the Japanese surrender, but refused to resume the role or have anything to do with the Dutch East Indies after the war. Hubertus van Mook took over during the Indonesian National Revolution. In 1949, following the Dutch–Indonesian Round Table Conference, the United States of Indonesia were granted full indpendence with the President of Indonesia replacing the Dutch Monarch and Governor-General as head of state.

== Governors ==
Below is the list of the Dutch East Indies' governors:

=== Dutch East India Company rule ===
Dutch East India Company
No.	Portrait	Name	Took office	Left office
1		Pieter Both (1568–1615)	19 December 1610	6 November 1614
2		Gerard Reynst (1568–1615)	6 November 1614	7 December 1615
3		Laurens Reael (1583–1637)	7 December 1615	21 March 1619
4		Jan Pieterszoon Coen (1587–1629)	30 April 1618	1 February 1623
5		Pieter de Carpentier (1586–1659)	1 February 1623	30 September 1627
(4)		Jan Pieterszoon Coen (1587–1629)	30 September 1627	21 September 1629
6		Jacques Specx (1585–1652)	22 September 1629	17 April 1632
7		Hendrik Brouwer (1581–1643)	18 April 1632	1 January 1636
8		Anthony van Diemen (1593–1645)	1 January 1636	19 April 1645
9		Cornelis van der Lijn (1608–1679)	19 April 1645	26 April 1650
10		Carel Reyniersz (1604–1653)	26 April 1650	19 May 1653
11		Joan Maetsuycker (1606–1678)	19 May 1653	4 January 1678
12		Rijckloff van Goens (1619–1682)	4 January 1678	25 November 1681
13		Cornelis Speelman (1628–1684)	25 November 1681	11 January 1684
14		Johannes Camphuys (1634–1695)	11 January 1684	24 November 1691
15		Willem van Outhoorn (1635–1720)	24 September 1691	15 August 1704
16		Joan van Hoorn (1653–1711)	15 August 1704	30 October 1709
17		Abraham van Riebeeck (1653–1713)	30 October 1709	17 November 1713
18		Christoffel van Swoll (1668–1718)	17 November 1713	12 November 1718
19		Hendrick Zwaardecroon (1667–1728)	13 November 1718	8 July 1725
20		Mattheus de Haan (1663–1729)	8 July 1725	1 June 1729
21		Diederik Durven (1676–1740)	1 June 1729	28 May 1732
22		Dirck van Cloon (1684–1735)	28 May 1732	10 March 1735
23		Abraham Patras (1671–1737)	11 March 1735	3 May 1737
24		Adriaan Valckenier (1691–1751)	3 May 1737	6 November 1741
25		Johannes Thedens (1680–1748)	6 November 1741	28 May 1743
26		Gustaaf Willem van Imhoff (1705–1750)	28 May 1743	1 November 1750
27		Jacob Mossel (1704–1761)	1 November 1750	15 May 1761
28		Petrus Albertus van der Parra (1714–1775)	15 May 1761	28 December 1775
29		Jeremias van Riemsdijk (1712–1777)	28 December 1775	3 October 1777
30		Reynier de Klerck (1710–1780)	4 October 1777	1 September 1780
31		Willem Arnold Alting (1724–1800)	1 September 1780	17 February 1797

=== Dutch government rule ===
Dutch East Indies
No.	Portrait	Name	Took office	Left office	Monarch
1		Pieter Gerardus van Overstraten (1755–1801)	16 August 1796	22 August 1801	Batavian Republic (19 January 1795 – 5 June 1806)
2		Johannes Siberg (1740–1817)	22 August 1801	19 October 1804	Batavian Republic (19 January 1795 – 5 June 1806)
3		Albertus Henricus Wiese (1761–1810)	19 October 1804	5 June 1806	Batavian Republic (19 January 1795 – 5 June 1806)
French interregnum in the Dutch East Indies under the Kingdom of Holland
3		Albertus Henricus Wiese (1761–1810)	5 June 1806	14 January 1808	Lodewijk I (5 June 1806 – 1 July 1810); House of Bonaparte
4		Herman Willem Daendels (1762–1818)	14 January 1808	15 May 1811	Lodewijk I (5 June 1806 – 1 July 1810); House of Bonaparte
4		Herman Willem Daendels (1762–1818)	14 January 1808	15 May 1811	Lodewijk II (1 July 1810 – 9 July 1810); House of Bonaparte
5		Jan Willem Janssens (1762–1838)	15 May 1811	18 September 1811	Napoleon I (9 July 1810 – 18 September 1811); House of Bonaparte
British interregnum in the Dutch East Indies
—		Robert Rollo Gillespie (1766–1814); Acting Governor	9 August 1811	18 September 1811	George III (9 August 1811 – 19 August 1816); House of Hanover
6		Stamford Raffles (1781–1826)	18 September 1811	12 March 1816	George III (9 August 1811 – 19 August 1816); House of Hanover
7		John Fendall (1762–1825)	12 March 1816	19 August 1816	George III (9 August 1811 – 19 August 1816); House of Hanover
Netherlands regained full control with three commissioners-general
8		Cornelis Theodorus Elout (1767–1841)	19 August 1816	16 January 1819	Willem I (19 August 1816 – 16 January 1819); House of Orange-Nassau
8		Godert van der Capellen (1778–1848)	19 August 1816	16 January 1819	Willem I (19 August 1816 – 16 January 1819); House of Orange-Nassau
8		Arnold Adriaan Buyskes (1771–1838)	19 August 1816	16 January 1819	Willem I (19 August 1816 – 16 January 1819); House of Orange-Nassau
Cornelis Theodorus Elout and Arnold Adriaan Buyskes left
9		Godert van der Capellen (1778–1848)	16 January 1819	1 January 1826	Willem I (16 January 1819 – 7 October 1840); House of Orange-Nassau
10		Leonard du Bus de Gisignies (1780–1849); De Jure Governor-General	2 January 1826	16 January 1830	Willem I (16 January 1819 – 7 October 1840); House of Orange-Nassau
10		Hendrik Merkus de Kock (1779–1845); Lieutenant Governor-General	2 January 1826	16 January 1830	Willem I (16 January 1819 – 7 October 1840); House of Orange-Nassau
11		Johannes van den Bosch (1780–1844)	16 January 1830	2 July 1833	Willem I (16 January 1819 – 7 October 1840); House of Orange-Nassau
12		Jean Chrétien Baud (1789–1859)	2 July 1833	29 February 1836	Willem I (16 January 1819 – 7 October 1840); House of Orange-Nassau
13		Dominique Jacques de Eerens (1781–1840)	29 February 1836	30 May 1840	Willem I (16 January 1819 – 7 October 1840); House of Orange-Nassau
—		Carel van Hogendorp (1788–1856); Acting Governor-General	30 May 1840	6 January 1841	Willem I (16 January 1819 – 7 October 1840); House of Orange-Nassau
14		Pieter Merkus (1787–1844)	6 January 1841	2 August 1844	Willem II (7 October 1840 – 17 March 1849); House of Orange-Nassau
—		Joan Cornelis Reynst (1798–1871); Acting Governor-General	2 August 1844	30 September 1845	Willem II (7 October 1840 – 17 March 1849); House of Orange-Nassau
15		Jan Jacob Rochussen (1797–1871)	30 September 1845	12 May 1851	Willem II (7 October 1840 – 17 March 1849); House of Orange-Nassau
16		Albertus Duymaer van Twist (1809–1887)	15 May 1851	22 May 1856	Willem III (17 March 1849 – 23 November 1890); House of Orange-Nassau
17		Charles Ferdinand Pahud (1803–1873)	22 May 1856	2 September 1861	Willem III (17 March 1849 – 23 November 1890); House of Orange-Nassau
—		Ary Prins (1816–1867); Acting Governor-General	2 September 1861	19 October 1861	Willem III (17 March 1849 – 23 November 1890); House of Orange-Nassau
18		Ludolph Sloet van de Beele (1806–1890)	19 October 1861	25 October 1866	Willem III (17 March 1849 – 23 November 1890); House of Orange-Nassau
—		Ary Prins (1816–1867); Acting Governor-General	25 October 1866	28 December 1866	Willem III (17 March 1849 – 23 November 1890); House of Orange-Nassau
19		Pieter Mijer (1812–1881)	28 December 1866	1 January 1872	Willem III (17 March 1849 – 23 November 1890); House of Orange-Nassau
20		James Loudon (1824–1900)	1 January 1872	26 March 1875	Willem III (17 March 1849 – 23 November 1890); House of Orange-Nassau
21		Johan Wilhelm van Lansberge (1830–1905)	26 March 1875	12 April 1881	Willem III (17 March 1849 – 23 November 1890); House of Orange-Nassau
22		Frederik s'Jacob (1822–1901)	12 April 1881	20 January 1884	Willem III (17 March 1849 – 23 November 1890); House of Orange-Nassau
23		Otto van Rees (1823–1892)	20 January 1884	29 September 1888	Willem III (17 March 1849 – 23 November 1890); House of Orange-Nassau
24		Cornelis Pijnacker Hordijk (1847–1908)	29 September 1888	17 October 1893	Willem III (17 March 1849 – 23 November 1890); House of Orange-Nassau
25		Carel Aart van der Wijck (1840–1914)	17 October 1893	3 October 1899	Wilhelmina (23 November 1890 – 8 March 1942); House of Orange-Nassau
26		Willem Rooseboom (1843–1920)	3 October 1899	1 October 1904	Wilhelmina (23 November 1890 – 8 March 1942); House of Orange-Nassau
27		Johannes van Heutsz (1851–1924)	1 October 1904	18 December 1909	Wilhelmina (23 November 1890 – 8 March 1942); House of Orange-Nassau
28		Alexander Idenburg (1861–1935)	18 December 1909	21 March 1916	Wilhelmina (23 November 1890 – 8 March 1942); House of Orange-Nassau
29		Johan Paul van Limburg Stirum (1873–1948)	21 March 1916	24 March 1921	Wilhelmina (23 November 1890 – 8 March 1942); House of Orange-Nassau
30		Dirk Fock (1858–1941)	24 March 1921	6 September 1926	Wilhelmina (23 November 1890 – 8 March 1942); House of Orange-Nassau
31		Andries Cornelis Dirk de Graeff (1872–1957)	6 September 1926	11 September 1931	Wilhelmina (23 November 1890 – 8 March 1942); House of Orange-Nassau
32		Bonifacius Cornelis de Jonge (1875–1958)	12 September 1931	16 September 1936	Wilhelmina (23 November 1890 – 8 March 1942); House of Orange-Nassau
33		Alidius Tjarda van Starkenborgh (1888–1978)	16 September 1936	8 March 1942	Wilhelmina (23 November 1890 – 8 March 1942); House of Orange-Nassau
Japanese occupation and Indonesian National Revolution
—		Hubertus Johannes van Mook (1894–1965); Lieutenant Governor-General	8 March 1942	15 October 1948	Wilhelmina (8 March 1942 – 4 September 1948); House of Orange-Nassau
—		Louis Joseph Maria Beel (1902–1977); High Representative of the Crown	29 October 1948	18 May 1949	Juliana (4 September 1948 – 27 December 1949); House of Orange-Nassau
—		Antonius Hermanus Lovink (1902–1995); High Representative of the Crown	18 May 1949	27 December 1949	Juliana (4 September 1948 – 27 December 1949); House of Orange-Nassau
Establishment of the Netherlands-Indonesia Union
—		Petrus Johannes Idenburg (1896–1976); Director General of General Affairs	27 December 1949	15 February 1956	Juliana (27 December 1949 – 15 February 1956); House of Orange-Nassau

== See also ==
- Japanese occupation of the Dutch East Indies
- President of Indonesia
  - List of presidents of Indonesia
- Prime Minister of Indonesia

== Sources ==
- Cribb, R. C.; Kahin, A. R. (2004). Historical Dictionary of Indonesia. Lanham: Scarecrow Press. ISBN 9780810849358.
