= Dutch Suratte =

Colonial trading company

Nederlandse vestiging van Suratte
- 1616–1825
- Flag Coat of arms

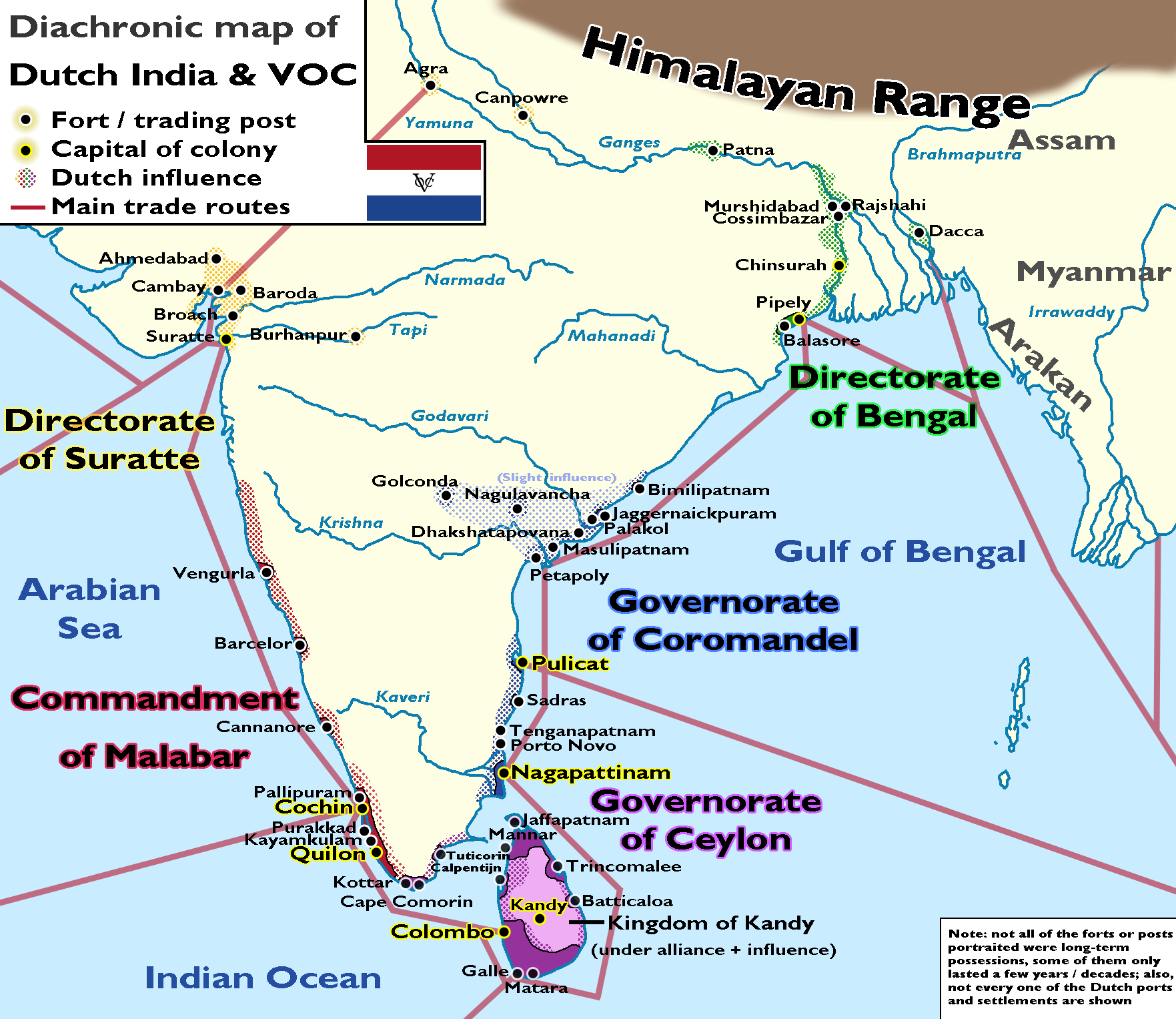
- Dutch Suratte (in yellow) within Dutch India
- Status: Factory
- Capital: Suratte
- Common languages: Dutch
- Director
  - 1620–1628: Pieter van den Broecke
  - 1673–1676: Willem Volger
  - 1699–1701: Hendrick Zwaardecroon
  - 1729–1740: Pieter Phoonsen
  - 1818–1825: Conrad Josef Gustaf van Albedyll
- Historical era: Imperialism
  - Establishment of a trading post at Suratte: 1616
  - Handover to the British according to the Anglo-Dutch Treaty of 1824: 21 December 1825
Preceded by	Succeeded by
Mughal Empire	Company rule in India

Dutch Suratte, officially Nederlandse vestiging van Suratte (Dutch settlement in Surat), was a directorate of the Dutch East India Company between 1616 and 1795, with its main factory in the city of Surat. Surat was an important trading city of the Mughal Empire on the river Tapti, and the Portuguese had been trading there since 1540. In the early 17th century, Portuguese traders were displaced by English and Dutch traders.

Due to internal unrest in the Mughal Empire, Surat's trade with the Mughal capital of Agra gradually declined in the early 18th century, with most trade shifting to Bombay, the new capital of the English Western Presidency. The city became part of British India as a consequence of the Third Carnatic War (1756–1763). While traders of the Dutch East India Company continued trading in Surat, they had become subordinate to the English.

The Dutch possessions in Surat were occupied by British forces in 1795 by instruction of Dutch stadtholder William V, who wanted to prevent revolutionary France from taking possession of the Dutch holdings in Asia. It was restored to the Dutch in 1818, but again ceded to the English in 1825, owing to the provisions of the Anglo-Dutch Treaty of 1824.

== History ==
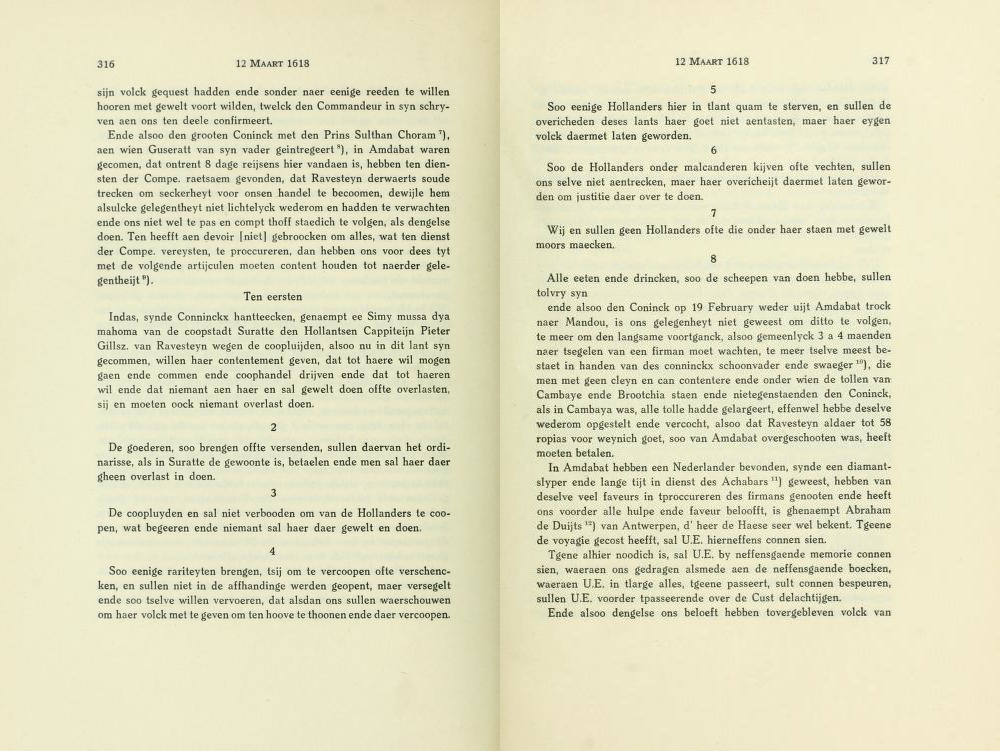
Dutch translation of a farman issued by Jahangir, the first known Firman directed towards the VOC in Gujarat, contained in a letter from P. G. van Ravesteyn and A. W. Goeree to J. P. Coen, dated 12th March 1618. The farman was issued after intense lobbying by VOC factors during Jahangir's visit to Ahmedabad. The farman granted few notable assurances to the factors, such as freedom to trade at any Mughal ports, autonomy to govern their affairs, application of normal customs duty (believed to be 2.5% during Jahangir's reign), freedom to trade with local merchants and profess their religion.

Pieter van den Broecke established a Dutch trading post in Suratte in 1616, after previous efforts had failed in the years before. The Dutch East India Company was compelled to form this post after the sultan of Aceh no longer allowed them to buy cheap cotton on the local market. In 1668, Dutch and English traders were joined by the French, who established their first trading post on the Indian subcontinent there.

In 1691, Hendrik van Rheede, administrator of the Dutch East India Company, died on his way from Kochi in Dutch Malabar to Suratte. He was buried with much pomp and circumstance on the Dutch-Armenian cemetery of Surat.

By 1759, the Dutch East India Company's trade had fallen substantially. Trade had largely moved to British Bombay, with Suratte playing only a subordinate role. Due to the provisions of the Kew Letters, Dutch Suratte came under English protection in 1795, who promised to restore it to the Dutch upon the restoration of peace in Europe. Initially, the English allowed the Dutch to continue their trade and even permitted them to fly the Dutch flag on their factories, but in February 1797, the English flag replaced the Dutch flag, and three months later, the last Dutch military forces left the city.

The Treaty of Amiens of 1802 was supposed to restore Dutch Suratte to Dutch rule, leading the Dutch to send a commission under the leadership of Carl Ludwig Maximilian van Albedyll to take possession of the Dutch factory in Suratte. However, before Suratte could be restored to the Dutch, hostilities in Europe had resumed, and Van Albedyll and his company were made prisoners of war on 30 August 1803. Van Albedyll died less than a year later while still imprisoned, on 12 August 1804.

When the Anglo-Dutch Treaty of 1814 again restored the Dutch possessions in Suratte to Dutch rule, Van Albedyll's son Conrad Josef Gustaf van Albedyll, who had traveled to Surat as part of the commission under the leadership of his father, was installed as the new resident of Dutch Suratte on 1 May 1818. He remained in office until Dutch Suratte was again relinquished to the British by the Anglo-Dutch Treaty of 1824, which divided East Asia into Dutch and British spheres of influence.

== Legacy ==
Surat still has a Dutch-Armenian cemetery, which features the mausoleum of Hendrik van Rheede. Bharuch has remnants of the Dutch lodge and a Dutch cemetery. Agra features a mausoleum for Jan Willem Hessing (1739–1803), a Dutch soldier who became a military adviser to Maharaja Mahadaji Shinde.

== Trading posts ==
Dutch Suratte (Note: Agra and Burhanpur not in their actual position)

Settlement	Type	Established	Disestablished	Notes
Suratte	Factory	1616	1825	Founded by Pieter van den Broecke in 1616. After the British took the city of Suratte from the Mughal Empire in 1759, the trading post's role diminished. Eventually relinquished to the British in the Kew Letters and temporarily restored to the Dutch between 1818 and 1825.
Ahmadabad	Factory	1617	1744	Important trading port. The Dutch East India Company office was founded in 1617 and eventually abandoned in 1744.
Agra	Factory	1621	1720	Capital of the Mughal Empire. Due to the remote location of six weeks travel from Suratte, the trading post was almost never visited by inspectors of the Dutch East India Company. Private trading (forbidden by the Dutch East India Company) and corruption made traders here rich men.
Cambay	Factory	1617	1643	Rather unsuccessful post due to the inability of ships to dock at the port at low tide. After problems with local merchants closed in 1643.

== Image gallery ==
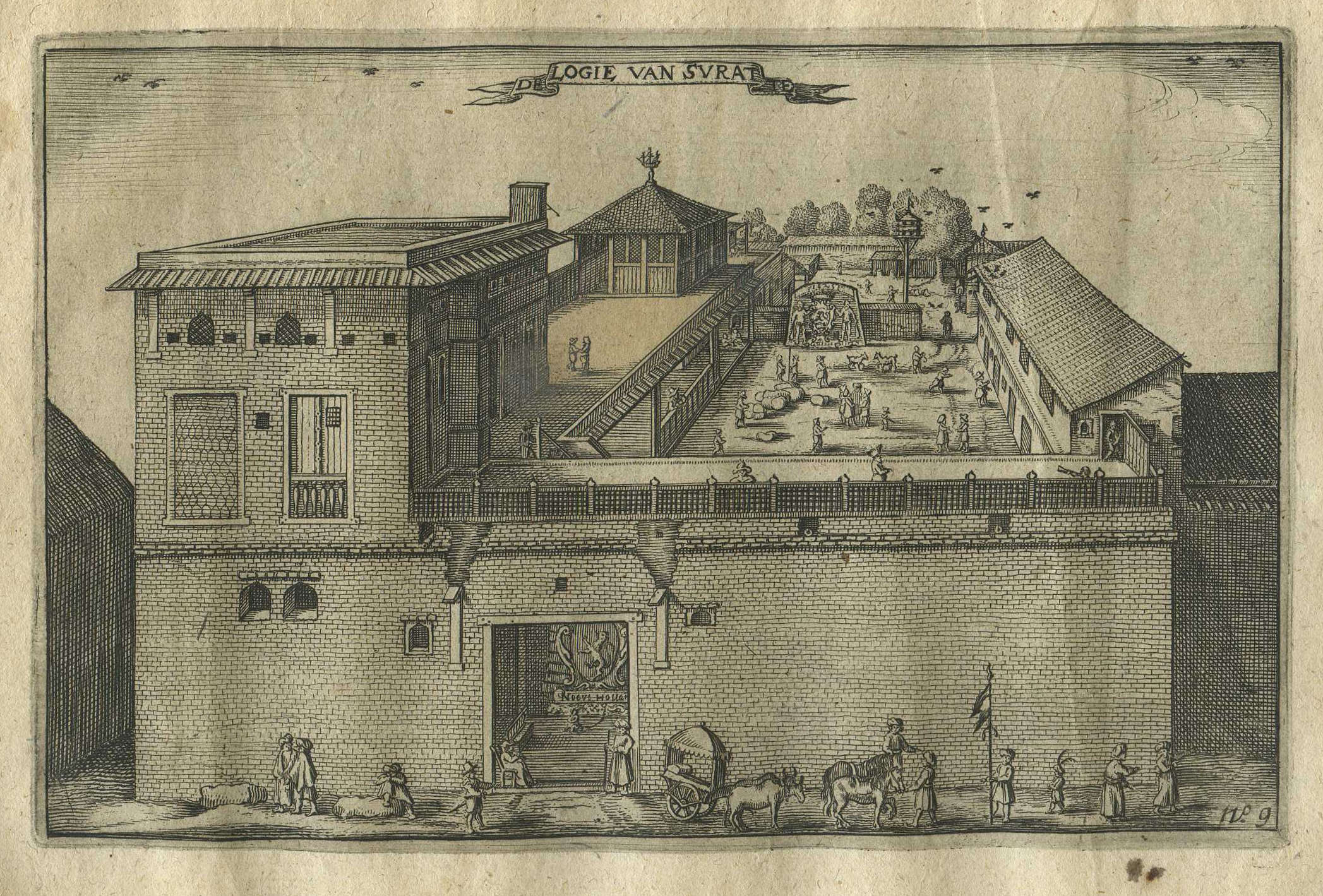
"Logie van Suratte", a view of the lodge of the Dutch East India Company (VOC) in Surat as seen in April 1629 by Pieter van den Broecke (1585–1640), a Dutch cloth merchant in the service of VOC.

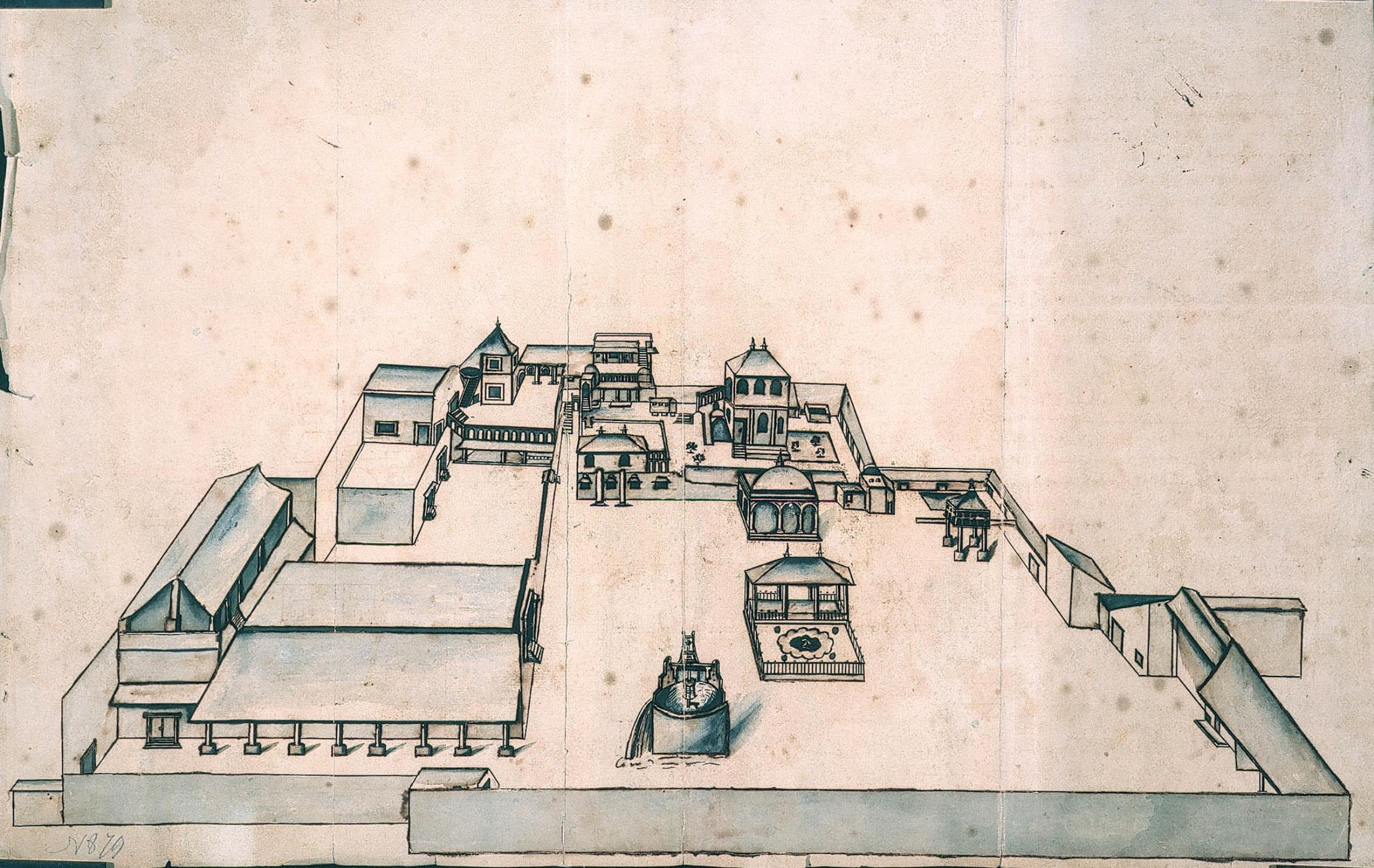
The Dutch lodge at Ahmedabat.

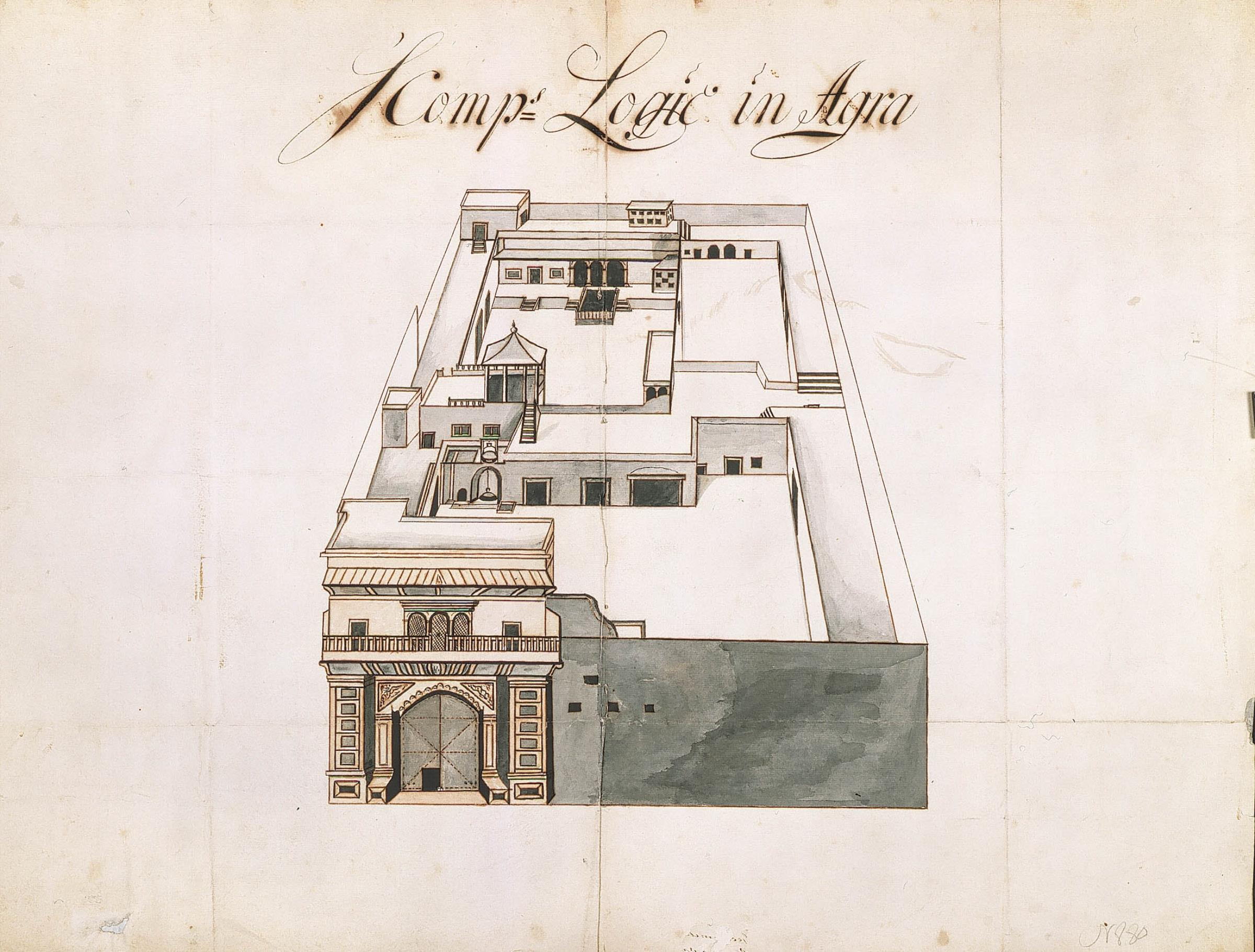
The Dutch lodge at Agra.

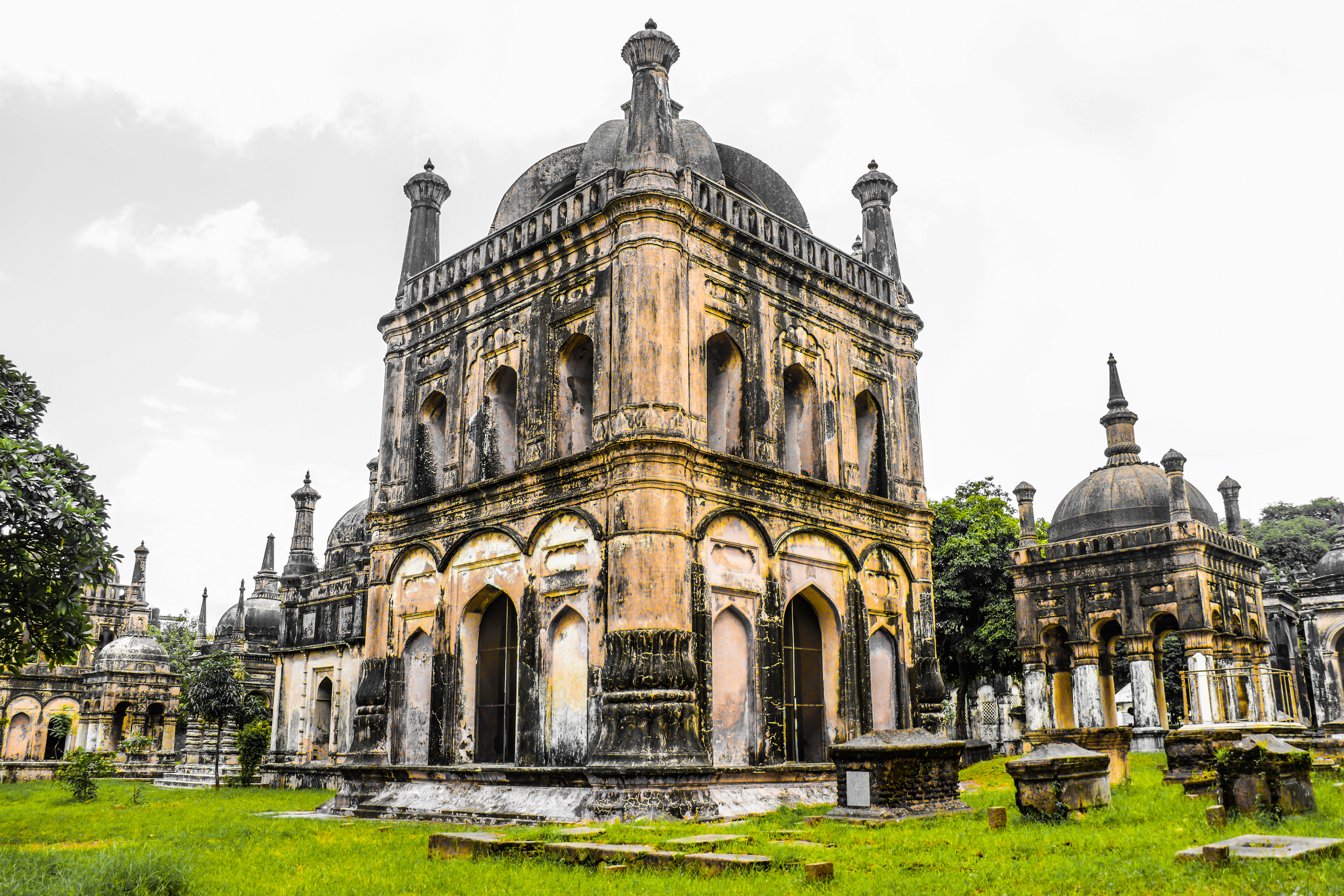
The Dutch-Armenian cemetery in Surat.

== See also ==
- Dutch India
  - Dutch Malabar
  - Dutch Ceylon
  - Dutch Coromandel
  - Dutch Bengal
- François Caron
- Mattheus de Haan
- Hubert Hugo
- Hendrik van Rheede
- Willem Verstegen
- Hendrick Zwaardecroon
