= Governor Reynst =

Governor Reynst may refer to:

- Gerard Reynst (died 1615), 2nd Governor-General of the Dutch East Indies from 1614 to 1615
- Joan Cornelis Reynst (1798–1871), Acting Governor-General of the Dutch East Indies from 1844 to 1845
