= Joan van Hoorn =

Governor-General of the Dutch East Indies (1704-1709)

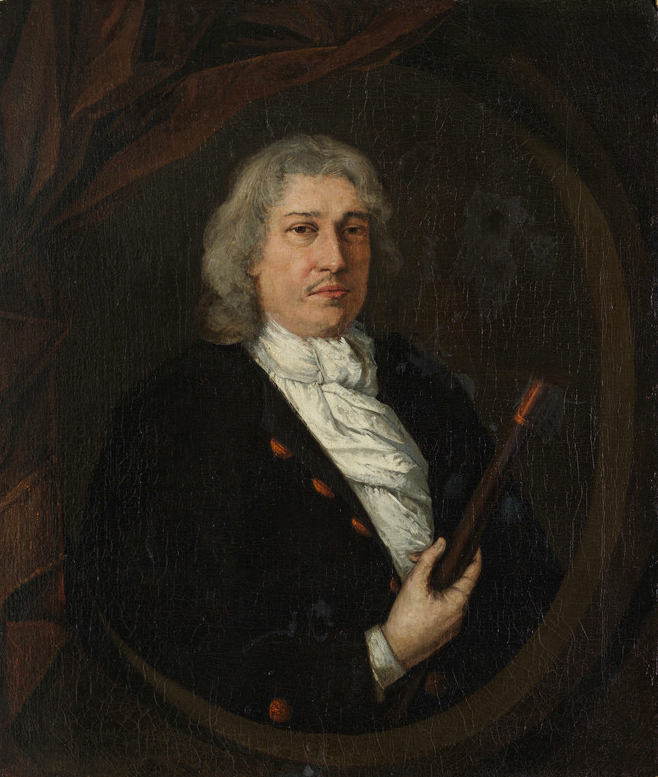
- Portrait of Joan van Hoorn

Governor-General of the Dutch East Indies
- In office 15 August 1704 – 30 October 1709
- Preceded by: Willem van Outhoorn
- Succeeded by: Abraham van Riebeeck

Personal details
- Born: 16 November 1653 Amsterdam, Dutch Republic
- Died: 21 February 1711 (aged 57) Amsterdam, Dutch Republic

Joan van Hoorn (16 November 1653 – 21 February 1711) was Governor-General of the Dutch East Indies from 1704 until 1709.

== Life ==
Joan (or Johan) van Hoorn was born on 16 November 1653, son to the wealthy Amsterdam gunpowder manufacturer, Pieter Janszn van Hoorn and his wife Sara Bessels, a grandchild of Gerard Reynst. As the gunpowder trade was no longer doing so well, his influential friends got him named as Counsellor-extraordinary (Raad extraordinair) to the Dutch Council of the Indies. The whole family left for the Indies in 1663, including Joan.

In 1665, when he was still only 12 years old, Joan van Hoorn was already Under-assistant (onder-assistant) in the Dutch East India Company (VOC). From July 1666 until January 1668, he accompanied his father on a mission to China, where he was received by the Kangxi Emperor. Thereafter, Van Hoorn made rapid progress in his career. He became Assistant (assistent) in 1671, Underbuyer (onderkoopman) in 1673, Buyer (koopman) and First Clerk to the general secretarial function in 1676. He was made Secretary to the High Government (Hoge Regering) of the Indies in 1678. On 11 August 1682 he became Counsellor-extraordinary to the Council of the Indies. In that same year he was sent on a visit to Bantam. He was also named President of the Weeskamer (overseeing the estates of orphans, etc.). In 1684, he became President of the College van Heemraden (looking after land boundaries, roads, etc.). A further visit to Bantam took place in 1685, following which he was named full Counsellor (Raad ordinair) of the Indies.

In 1691 Van Hoorn married Anna Struis. They had a daughter, Petronella Wilhelmina. She later married Jan Trip, the Mayor's son. A later marriage (1721) saw Petronella married to Lubbert Adolf Torck, Lord of Rozendaal.

Van Hoorn became Director-General in 1691. In this post, he completely reorganised the Company's administration. Following the death of his wife, he remarried, in 1692, this time to Susanna, the daughter of the then Governor-General Willem van Outhoorn. He himself was named, on 20 September 1701, as Governor-General in succession to his father-in-law. However, he declined to accept the post until three other high officials (Mattheus de Haan, Hendrick Zwaardecroon and de Roo), nominated by him, were admitted to the High Government of the Indies. He did this as he had no faith in the existing Council. The Seventeen Lords (Heren XVII) acceded to this demand and on 15 August 1704, Joan van Hoorn accepted the post of Governor General.

The early years of Joan van Hoorn's term of office were marked by the war then raging - the First Javanese War of Succession (1704 - 1708) . At first the Company wanted to stay out of the conflict, but eventually they had to take sides. In 1705, Joan van Hoorn concluded an agreement with Mataram, which ceded West Java to the Company. Joan van Hoorn experimented with coffee plantation. Prices were determined by the merchants at Mokha so to do something about this, the Company tried growing coffee in other regions. Subsequently, there was great expansion of coffee growing, especially in the Priangan uplands near Batavia.

On 16 November 1706, following the death of Susanna, Van Hoorn remarried, this time to Joanna Maria van Riebeeck, oldest daughter of the then Director-General Abraham van Riebeeck. She was also the widow of Gerard de Heere, who had been Counsellor of the Indies and Governor of Ceylon. A son was born on 2 February 1708, but he died shortly afterwards.

On 2 March 1708, Joan van Hoorn's request to leave post was granted. On 30 October 1709, he handed over the post to his father-in-law Abraham van Riebeeck. Despite his further request to remain in the Indies, he was recalled to the Netherlands, as Commander of the returning fleet. He bought a very pleasant house on the Herengracht in Amsterdam. The Heren XVII presented him with a gold chain and medallion. He died six months following his return on 21 February 1711. He was buried in the evening, as was then the fashion.
