= Frans Christiaan Eberhard Oldenburg =

Commander of the Dutch Gold Coast
- In office 2 May 1818 – 2 January 1820
- Monarch: William I of the Netherlands
- Preceded by: Herman Willem Daendels
- Succeeded by: Johannes Oosthout

Personal details
- Born: c. 1777; Melle, Prince-Bishopric of Osnabrück, Holy Roman Empire
- Died: 2 January 1820 (aged 42); St. George d'Elmina, Dutch Gold Coast
- Spouse: Ecoea Jacoba Küntzen

Frans Christiaan Eberhard Oldenburg (circa 1777 – 2 January 1820) was a colonial administrator on the Gold Coast, who served as Commander of the Dutch Gold Coast between 2 May 1818 and his death on 2 January 1820.

== Biography ==
Oldenburg was made second resident at the Coast of Guinea on 15 December 1807 and promoted to accountant general on 17 March 1810. On top of these duties, Oldenburg also became deputy commandant of Elmina on 15 August 1815. After Herman Willem Daendels arrived on the Gold Coast, his salary was raised and he was made provisional commandant of Elmina.

After the death of Daendels on 2 May 1818, he succeeded him as acting governor-general. Due to a change in the regulations of administration of the colony, his title changed to commander on 1 November 1819. Oldenburg died in office, on 2 January 1820.

== Personal life ==
Oldenburg had three children with Ecoea Jacoba Küntzen. Even though Oldenburg's last will and testament specified that all his children had to be sent to the Netherlands for education, Ecoea Jacoba Küntzen was able to keep her eldest daughter with her in Elmina after pleading with the colonial government in Elmina.
