= Johannes Oosthout =

Commander of the Dutch Gold Coast
- ad interim
- In office 2 January 1820 – 29 August 1821
- Monarch: William I of the Netherlands
- Preceded by: Frans Christiaan Eberhard Oldenburg
- Succeeded by: Friedrich Last

Personal details
- Born: c. 1792; The Hague, Netherlands
- Died: 29 August 1821 (aged 29); St. George d'Elmina, Dutch Gold Coast

Johannes Oosthout (circa 1792 – 29 August 1821) was a colonial administrator on the Gold Coast, who served as acting commander of the Dutch Gold Coast between 2 January 1820 and his death on 29 August 1821.

== Biography ==
Oosthout was born in The Hague to Petrus Balthazar Oosthout and Sophia Lange. He made a career in the colonial administration of the Dutch Gold Coast, and was mentioned as resident in the government instruction of 1 November 1819. After commander Frans Christiaan Eberhard Oldenburg died on 2 January 1820, Oosthout succeeded him as acting commander. Oosthout died in office, on 29 August 1821, of pleuritis.

Oosthout was buried on 30 August 1821 in the central tomb of the Dutch Cemetery of Elmina.
