= Christoffel van Swoll =

Governor-General of the Dutch East Indies

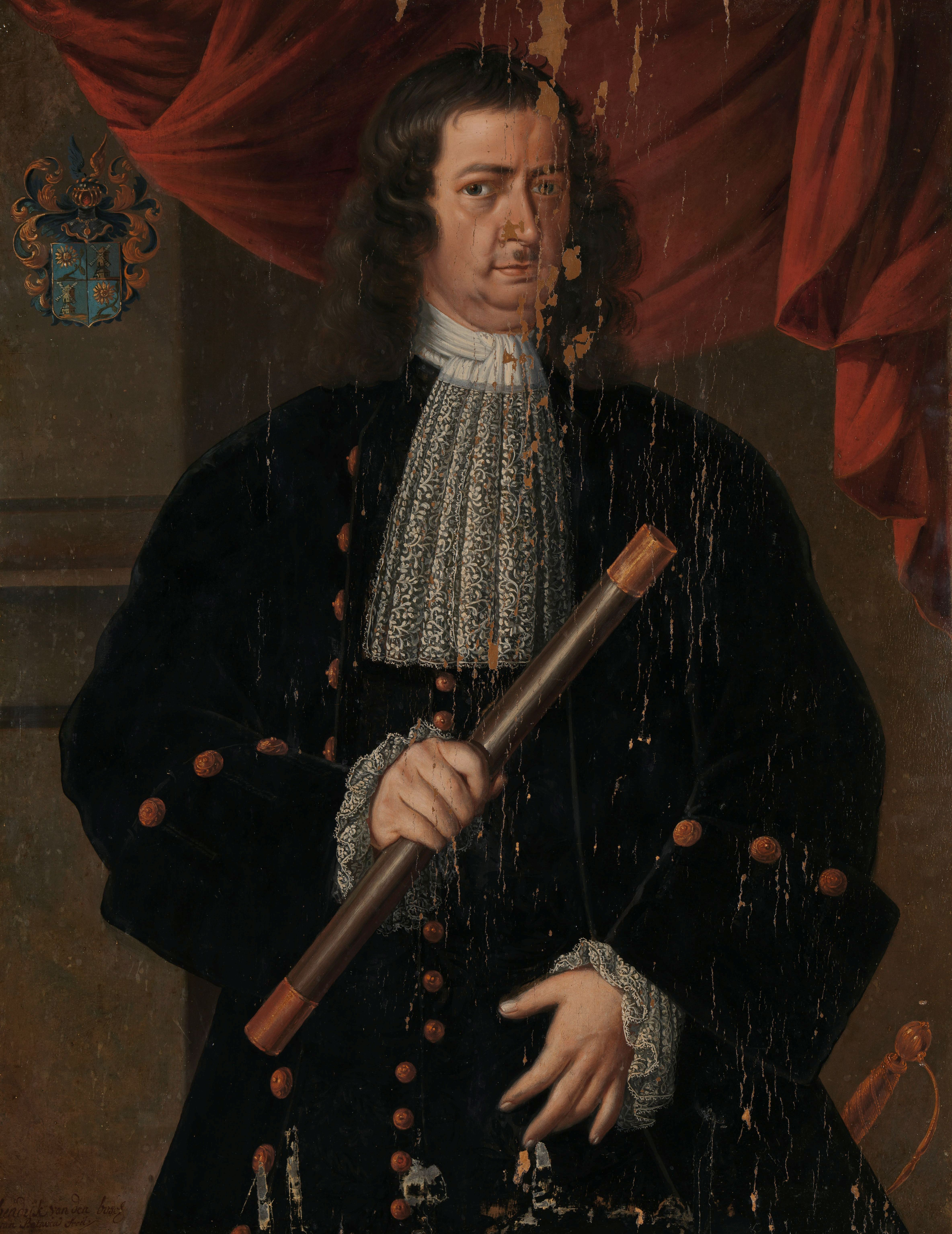

Governor-General of the Dutch East Indies
- In office 17 November 1713 – 12 November 1718
- Preceded by: Abraham van Riebeeck
- Succeeded by: Hendrick Zwaardecroon

Personal details
- Born: 25 April 1668 Amsterdam, Dutch Republic
- Died: 12 November 1718 (aged 50) Batavia, Dutch East Indies (present-day Indonesia)

Christoffel van Swoll (25 April 1668 – 12 November 1718) was Governor-General of the Dutch East Indies from 17 November 1713 until his death.

He was born in 1668 in Amsterdam as the son of Harmen Stoffelsz. van Swoll, an attendant of the Bank of Amsterdam. On 19 December 1683, he left for Batavia on board the Juffrouw Anna as an assistant in the service of the Dutch East India Company. He arrived in Batavia on 19 June 1684 and began working in the General Secretariat. He was regularly promoted. In 1686 he was promoted to Accountant, in 1690 to First Clerk to the General Secretariat, and in 1691 to Buyer. In 1696, he was appointed as Secretary to the High Government (de Hoge Regering). In 1700 he became Raad extra-ordinair (Counsellor extraordinary) and President of the College van Weesmeesteren (an orphanage). In 1701 he was named Raad ordinair van Indië (Full Counsellor of the Indies). On 3 May 1703 he became President of the College van Schepenen (Aldermen) at Batavia. Following the death of Governor-General Abraham van Riebeeck, the Council (Raad) chose van Swoll, by a slim majority, as Governor-General (on 17 November 1713). This proposal was sent to the 17 Lords of the Indies (de Heren XVII) on 18 May 1714 who confirmed his appointment in 1715, despite his difficulty character. His honesty was the deciding factor in those times of corruption and maladministration.

As Governor-General, he put a lot of energy into dealing with the private, or unofficial, trade. In this he was not really successful. In general, there was nothing particularly remarkable about his time in office. He was no great promoter of development, such as extending coffee farming. He was also against extending the territory of the Company, because he thought it would then become ungovernable. He suddenly dropped the price the Chinese got for tea by a third. The result was that the trade in tea (and porcelain) collapsed for years.

Four years after his provisional appointment as Governor-General, he died in Batavia on 12 November 1718. He was buried in the Church of the Holy Cross (Kruiskerk). His successor was named as Hendrick Zwaardecroon.
