= Diederik Durven =

Dutch Colonial administrator

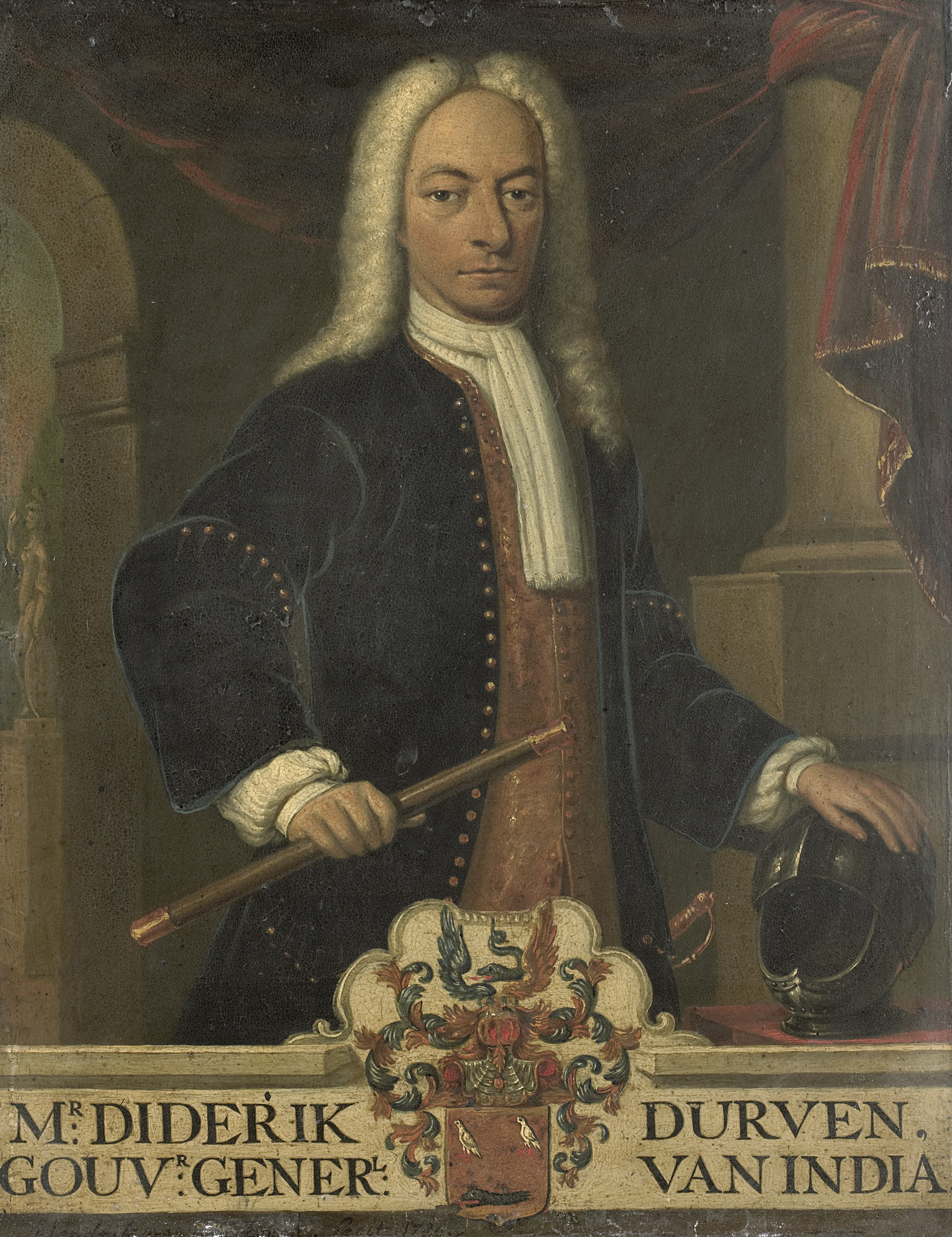
- Diederik Durven

Governor-General of the Dutch East Indies
- In office 1 June 1729 – 28 May 1732
- Preceded by: Mattheus de Haan
- Succeeded by: Dirck van Cloon

Personal details
- Born: 13 September 1676 Delft, Dutch Republic
- Died: 26 February 1740 (aged 63) Dutch Republic

Diederik Durven (13 September 1676 – 26 February 1740) was a Dutch colonial administrator and Governor-General of the Dutch East Indies from 1729 to 1732.

Durven studied Law at Leiden University where he graduated on 19 July 1702. He became an advocate in Delft in 1704. In 1705, he was nominated as a member of the Council of Justice at Batavia in the Indies. He left for Batavia on the "Grimmestein" on 4 January 1706, arriving later that year. After his appointment in 1720 to the Council of the Indies, he was sent, in 1722 and 1723, to supervise the gold- and silver-mines in Parang province. Subsequently, he became (in 1723) chairman of the College van Heemraden (i.e. drainage board, comparable to a polder board in the Dutch Republic), which was responsible for the management of land outside the city, including supervision of boundaries. He later become President of the Council of Justice - the supreme court of Dutch Asia. In 1729, Mattheus de Haan died. Diederik Durven succeeded him as provisional Governor-General. This did not last long, as the Directors of the East India Company were very impatient of the speed of change there. Following alleged financial misbehaviour, though more probably as a scapegoat, he was dismissed on 9 October 1731. He was succeeded by Dirck van Cloon. Diederik Durven died in the Netherlands on 26 February 1740.

== Bibliography ==
- Paulus, J., Graaff, S. d., Stibbe, D. G., Spat, C., Stroomberg, J., & Sandbergen, F. J. W. H. (1917). Encyclopaedie van Nederlandsch-Indië. 's-Gravenhage: M. Nijhoff
- Putten, L.P. van, 2002 Ambitie en onvermogen : gouverneurs-generaal van Nederlands-Indië 1610-1796.
