= Dominique Jacques de Eerens =

Dutch officer and administrator

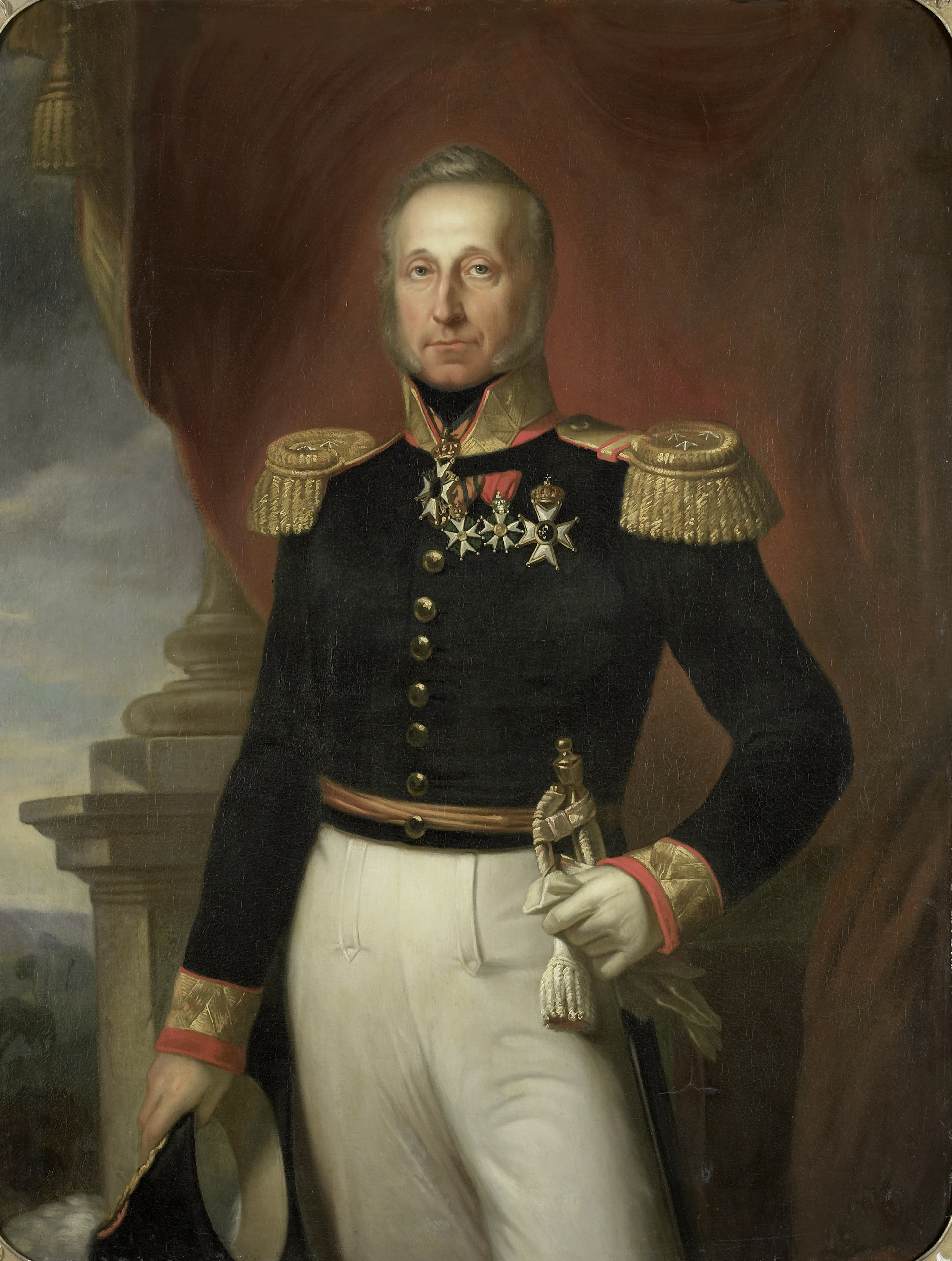
- Portrait by Cornelis Kruseman, c. 1855–1858

Governor-General of the Dutch East Indies
- In office 29 February 1836 – 30 May 1840
- Monarch: William I
- Preceded by: Jean Chrétien Baud
- Succeeded by: Carel van Hogendorp (acting); Pieter Merkus

Personal details
- Born: 17 March 1781; Alkmaar, Dutch Republic
- Died: 30 May 1840 (aged 59); Buitenzorg, Dutch East Indies

Dominique Jacques de Eerens (Alkmaar, 17 March 1781 – Buitenzorg (Dutch East Indies), 30 May 1840) was a Dutch major general, politician and administrator, governor-general of the Dutch East Indies and knight of the Military William Order.

Military officer, minister and colonial administrator during the time of William I. He joined the army at a young age and served under Schimmelpenninck, Louis Napoleon and Emperor Napoleon. He was taken prisoner in Russia as a member of the imperial staff and was wounded at Danzig. He fought as a major general in the Battle of Waterloo. He then held high-ranking positions in the army and became Director-General of War. As Lieutenant Governor-General of the Dutch East Indies, he fought against piracy and extended his authority to Sumatra. He was the only Catholic Governor-General. He died in Indonesia.

Pro-regering during the time of William I Positions during 1830–1840: Minister, Governor-General of the Dutch East Indies

Main Functions/Professions

- Provincial commander of North Brabant, around 1822
- Inspector-General, sixth major military command of infantry, from 20 December 1826
- Commander, third infantry division, from 7 July 1829 to 25 December 1839
- Director-General (Minister) of War, from 1 January 1830 to 1 October 1834
- Lieutenant Governor-General of the Dutch East Indies, from 5 March 1835 to 29 February 1836 (left for Java on 10 November 1834, arrived on 22 February 1835)
- Governor-General of the Dutch East Indies, from 29 February 1836 to 30 May 1840

Officer ranks

- Lieutenant-colonel in Dutch service, from 29 January 1814 to 30 April 1814
- Colonel, from 30 April 1814 to 21 April 1815
- Major general, from 21 April 1815 to 20 December 1826
- Lieutenant general, from 20 December 1826

From private life

- Mother died shortly after his birth
- Father was a doctor in Alkmaar, later a pastor in Vlodrop and Posterholt, and later in Holland. His father became a pastor after his wife’s death.
- Children were Protestants

Publications about

- S.A. Buddingh, The Editing of the Journal of Neerland's Studie in Memory of His Excellency the Lieutenant General D.J. de Eerens, Governor General of Neerland's Indies (1836–1840), Batavia, 1840
- M.A. van Rhede van der Kloot, Governors-General and General Commissioners of the Dutch East Indies, 1610–1888, 166
- New Dutch Biographical Dictionary, Volume I, 793

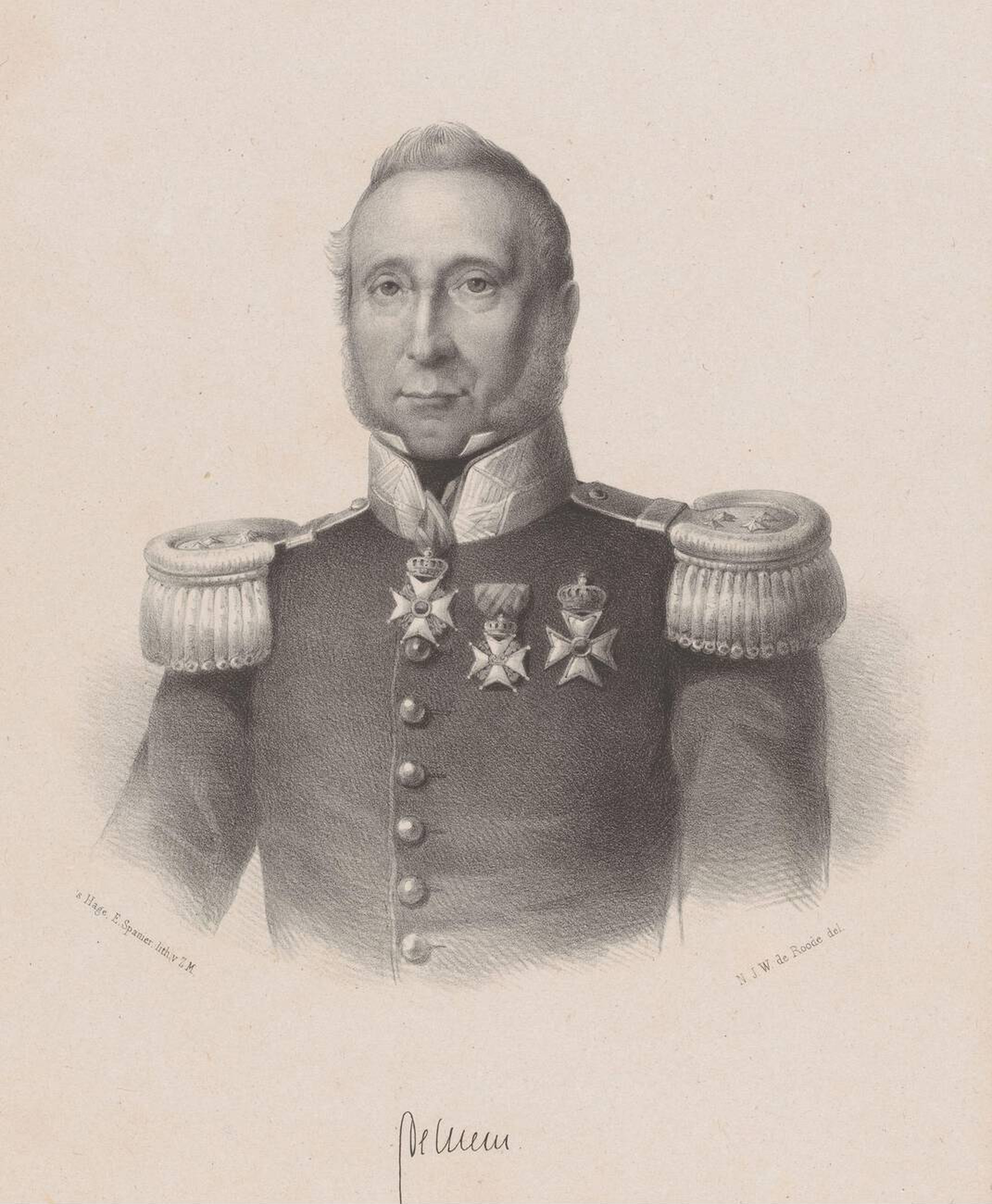
Dominique Jacques de Eerens (1781–1840) was a Dutch major general, politician, and colonial administrator who served as Governor-General of the Dutch East Indies (1836–1840), fought in the Napoleonic Wars, including Waterloo.

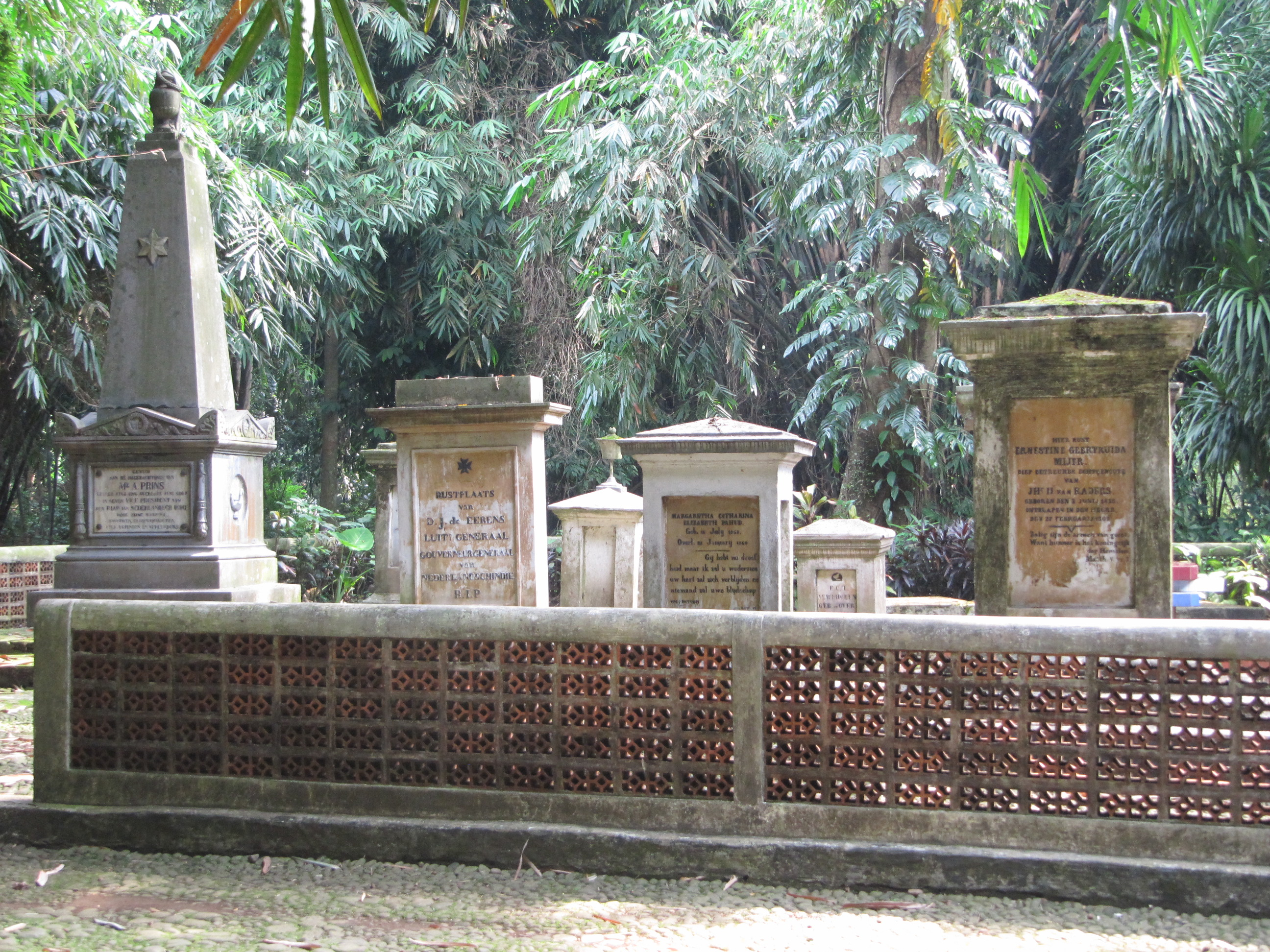
Grave of De Eerens (second from the left) in Bogor in 2013

Political offices
Preceded by Jean Chrétien Baud	Governor-General of the Dutch East Indies; 1836–1840	Succeeded by Carel van Hogendorp (acting); Pieter Merkus
