= Conrad Josef Gustaf van Albedyll =

Resident of Dutch Suratte
- In office 1 May 1818 – 21 December 1825
- Monarch: William I
- Governor General: Godert van der Capellen
- Preceded by: British occupation
- Succeeded by: position abolished

Personal details
- Born: 5 October 1786 Colombo, Dutch Ceylon
- Died: 11 May 1846 (aged 59) Kochi, British India
- Spouse: Amalia Ernestine van der Stoet

Conrad Josef Gustaf van Albedyll (5 October 1786 – 5 November 1846) was the last resident of Dutch Suratte between 1818 and 1825. He was an heir of the Albedyll family.

== Biography ==
Conrad Josef Gustaf van Albedyll was born in Colombo, Dutch Ceylon, to Carl Ludwig Maximilian van Albedyll and Maria Amalia de Crouse. His father was a Swedish nobleman originally from Stralsund, who had served as an officer in the Prussian army and had later made a career as a merchant in the service of the Dutch East India Company on Ceylon. His mother was the daughter of the Dutch resident of Kochi.

By 1796, Dutch Ceylon and the Dutch possessions on the Indian subcontinent had fallen in the hands of the English due to the provisions of the Kew Letters issued by Dutch stadtholder William V, who wanted to prevent revolutionary France from taking possession of the Dutch holdings in Asia. The Treaty of Amiens of 1802 was supposed to restore all Dutch possessions with the exception of Ceylon to Dutch rule, leading the Dutch to send a commission under the leadership of Carl Ludwig Maximilian van Albedyll, Conrad Josef Gustaf's father, to take possession of the Dutch factory in Suratte. However, before Suratte could be restored to the Dutch, hostilities in Europe had resumed, and Van Albedyll and his company were made prisoners of war on 30 August 1803. Carl Ludwig Maximilian van Albedyll died less than a year later while still imprisoned, on 12 August 1804.

When the Anglo-Dutch Treaty of 1814 again restored the Dutch possessions in Suratte to Dutch rule, Conrad Josef Gustaf van Albedyll, who had traveled to Surat as part of the commission under the leadership of his father, was installed as the new resident of Dutch Suratte on 1 May 1818. He remained in office until Dutch Suratte was again relinquished to the British by the Anglo-Dutch Treaty of 1824, which divided East Asia into Dutch and British spheres of influence.

After the transfer of the Dutch possessions in Suratte to the British, Conrad Josef Gustaf moved to Kochi, the birthplace of his mother, where he died on 5 November 1846.

== Personal life ==
Henricus Franciscus married Amalia Ernestine van der Stoet on 5 May 1815. They had six children.
