= Dirck van Cloon =

Dutch colonial governor (1684–1735)

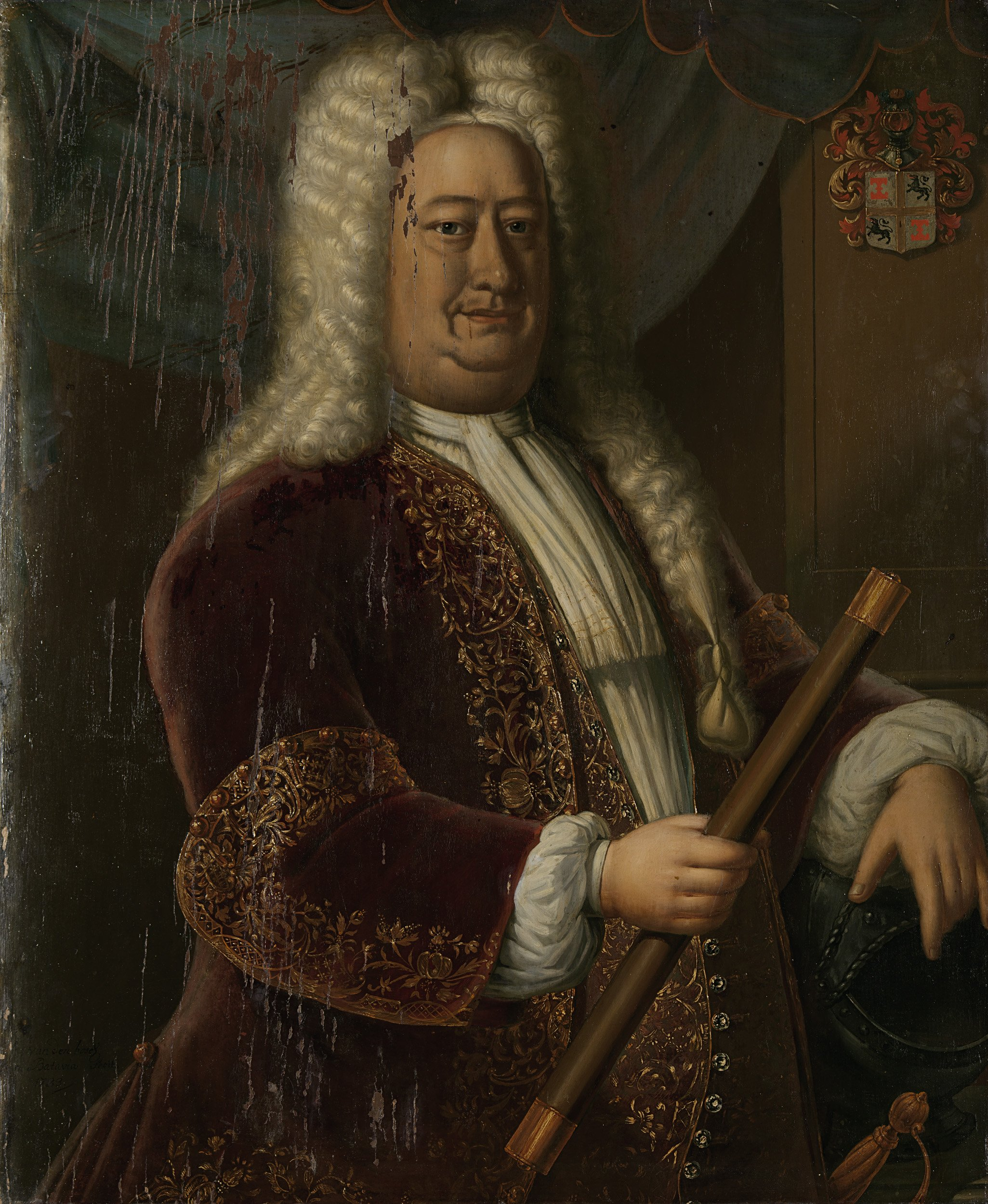
- Dirck van Cloon as Governor General of the Indies

Governor-General of the Dutch East Indies
- In office 28 May 1732 – 10 March 1735
- Preceded by: Diederik Durven
- Succeeded by: Abraham Patras

Personal details
- Born: 1684 Batavia, Dutch East Indies (present-day Indonesia)
- Died: 10 March 1735 (aged 50–51) Batavia, Dutch East Indies

Dirck van Cloon (also Dirk and Theodoor van Cloon; 1684 – 10 March 1735) was Eurasian Governor-General of the Dutch East Indies. He died of malaria at the age of 50.

He was born in Batavia sometime in 1684. For his education and training he was sent to the Netherlands. He graduated in Law at Leiden University on 1 April 1707.

He returned to Batavia on the clipper Donkervliet and spent some time in Dutch Coromandel. He was among other things a district overseer in Sadraspatnam. He got into a fight with the governor of Coromandel, Adriaan de Visser, who accused Van Cloon of delivering bad quality goods. The government in Batavia sent Van Cloon back to the Netherlands, but he persuaded the Directors of the Dutch East India Company that de Visser was not to be trusted. Van Cloon was reinstated and he left for the Indies on 4 November 1719 on board the van de Huis te Assenburg as supercargo. In 1720, he became district chief at Negapatnam. In 1723, he became Governor of Dutch Coromandel. In 1724, he returned to Batavia to advise the Governor-General and in 1730, he became “Raad-ordinair” (chief advisor) of the Indies.

On 9 October 1731 the Directors of the Dutch East India Company named Dirck van Cloon Governor-General of the Indies, to which he succeeded on 28 May 1732, following the disgrace of Diederik Durven. By 20 December 1733 van Cloon was asking to resign because of sickness. He died in the post, however, and it was not until after he had died that his successor took over. Van Cloon was involved in a stand-off with the nascent Swedish East India Company, but he resolved it amicably. Less happy was an insurrection of unemployed Chinese sugar plantation workers. This was caused by the collapse of the sugar market, due to over-production and government mishandling.
