= Mattheus de Haan =

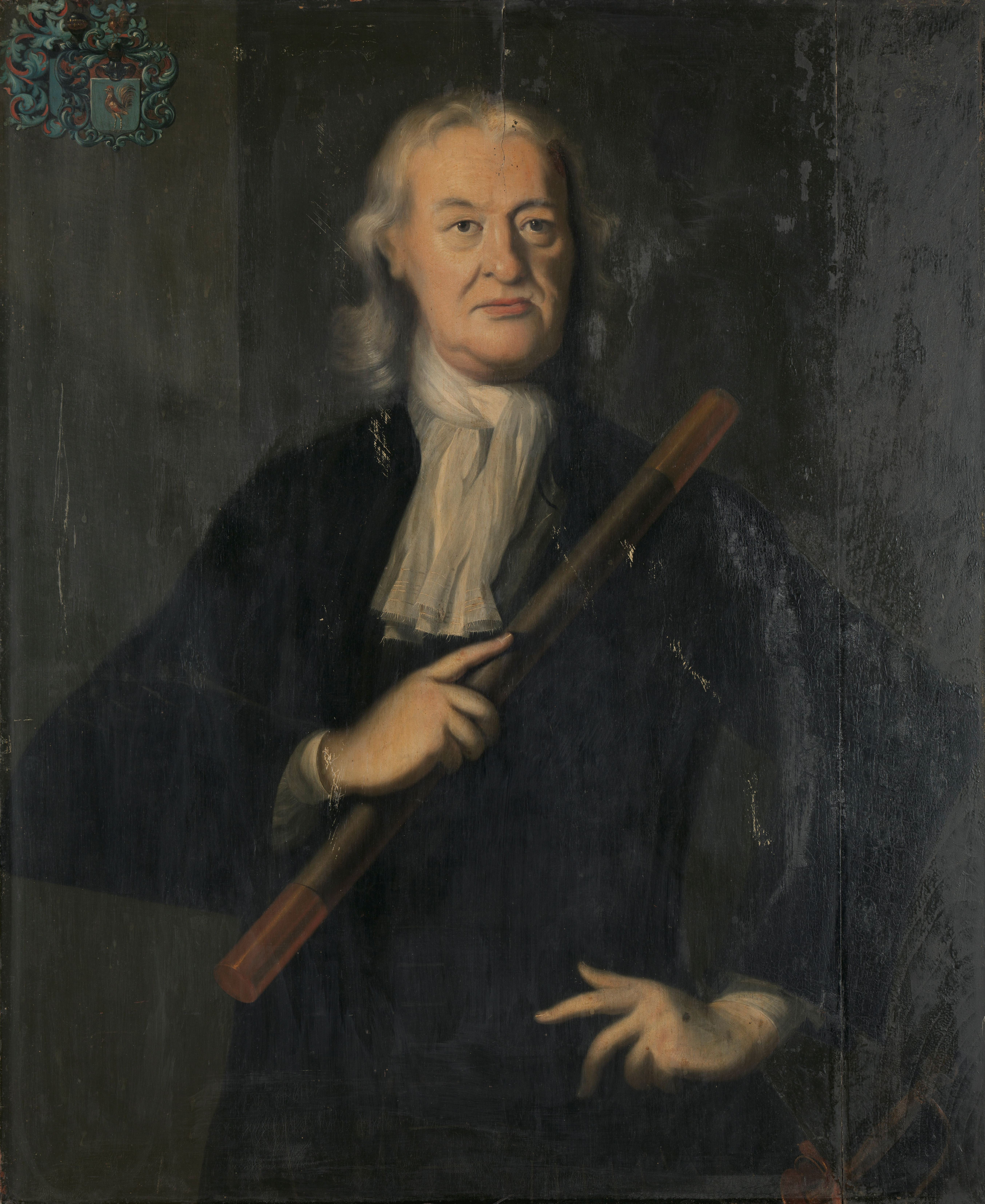

Governor-General of the Dutch East Indies
- In office 8 July 1725 – 1 June 1729
- Preceded by: Hendrick Zwaardecroon
- Succeeded by: Diederik Durven

Personal details
- Born: 19 October 1663 Dordrecht, Dutch Republic
- Died: 1 June 1729 (aged 65) Batavia, Dutch East Indies (present-day Indonesia)

Mattheus de Haan (19 October 1663 – 1 June 1729) was Governor-General of the Dutch East Indies from 1725 to 1729.

== Life ==
De Haan was born in Dordrecht on 19 October 1663. On 26 October 1671 he left for the Indies, where his father had been appointed as Underbuyer (onderkoopman) in the Dutch East India Company (VOC). He then quickly went through posts in the lower levels of that organisation in Dutch Suratte. There, in 1676, he was made Provisional Assistant (provisioneel assistent), and in 1681 he became assistent. He became Bookkeeper (boekhouder) in 1683, and, in 1685, onderkoopman (Underbuyer/Undermerchant). Ten years later, in 1695, he was promoted to Buyer/Merchant (koopman). The next year he had to move to Batavia, to take up the post of Second Senior Buyer (tweede opperkoopman) in the company's headquarters there. Two years later, in 1698, he was promoted to First Senior Buyer (eerste opperkoopman). He became Secretary (secretaris) to the High Government of the Indies in 1700 and, in 1702, vice-president of the Council of Justice. He was made a Counsellor-extraordinary (Raad extraordinair) of the Dutch Council of the Indies in 1704. He was then appointed President of the College van Schepenen in 1705. Five years later, he was made full Counsellor of the Indies and in 1722 he became Director-General. On 16 October 1724 he was nominated Governor-General, taking over from Hendrick Zwaardecroon on 8 July 1725.

Characteristic of his time in office was his opposition Zwaardecroon's encouragement of silk cultivation. Coffee production in the De Preanger region (Parahyangan uplands to the south of Batavia) went enormously well and de Haan felt that this would lead to a decline in coffee prices in Europe, so he lowered the prices paid to the coffee farmers. Their response was to chop down some of the coffee plantations. This was not what was intended, and De Haan forbade it. Meanwhile, there was further heavy damage to the production of coffee. Coffee from Java went mainly to Europe. They never managed to get into the Asian market. Coffee from Mokha took off there, as did the Arabic coffee of the English. No action was taken against this. The English also began to play a more important role in the cotton and tea trade. De Haan died, after lying ill for three days, on 1 June 1729. He was buried in Batavia and was followed as Governor-General by Diederik Durven.
