= Carel Sirardus Willem van Hogendorp =

Dutch colonial governor (1788–1856)

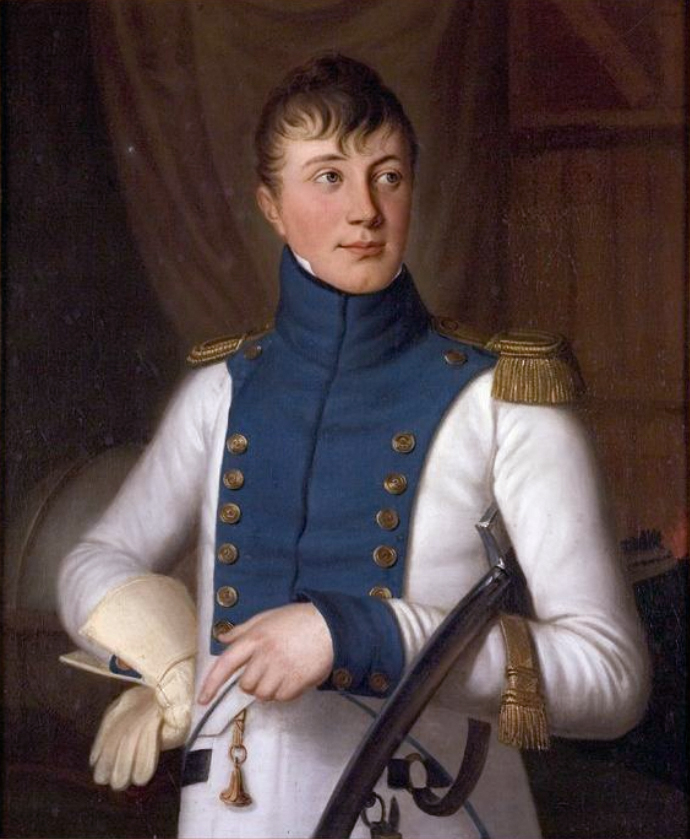
- Van Hogendorp in c. 1806–1810

Governor-General of the Dutch East Indies
- In office 1 June 1840 – 6 January 1841
- Monarchs: William I William II
- Preceded by: Dominique Jacques de Eerens
- Succeeded by: Pieter Merkus

Personal details
- Born: 15 August 1788 Cossimbazar, British East India
- Died: 29 October 1856 (aged 68) Utrecht, Netherlands

Carel Sirardus Willem, Count van Hogendorp (15 August 1788 – 29 October 1856) was acting Governor-General of the Dutch East Indies in 1840–1841.

== Bibliography ==
- 1837: Tafereelen van Javaansche zeden (Scenes of Javanese mores)

Political offices
Preceded by Dominique Jacques de Eerens	Governor-General of the Dutch East Indies; 1840–1841	Succeeded by Pieter Merkus
