= Albertus Henricus Wiese =

Governor-General of the Dutch East Indies

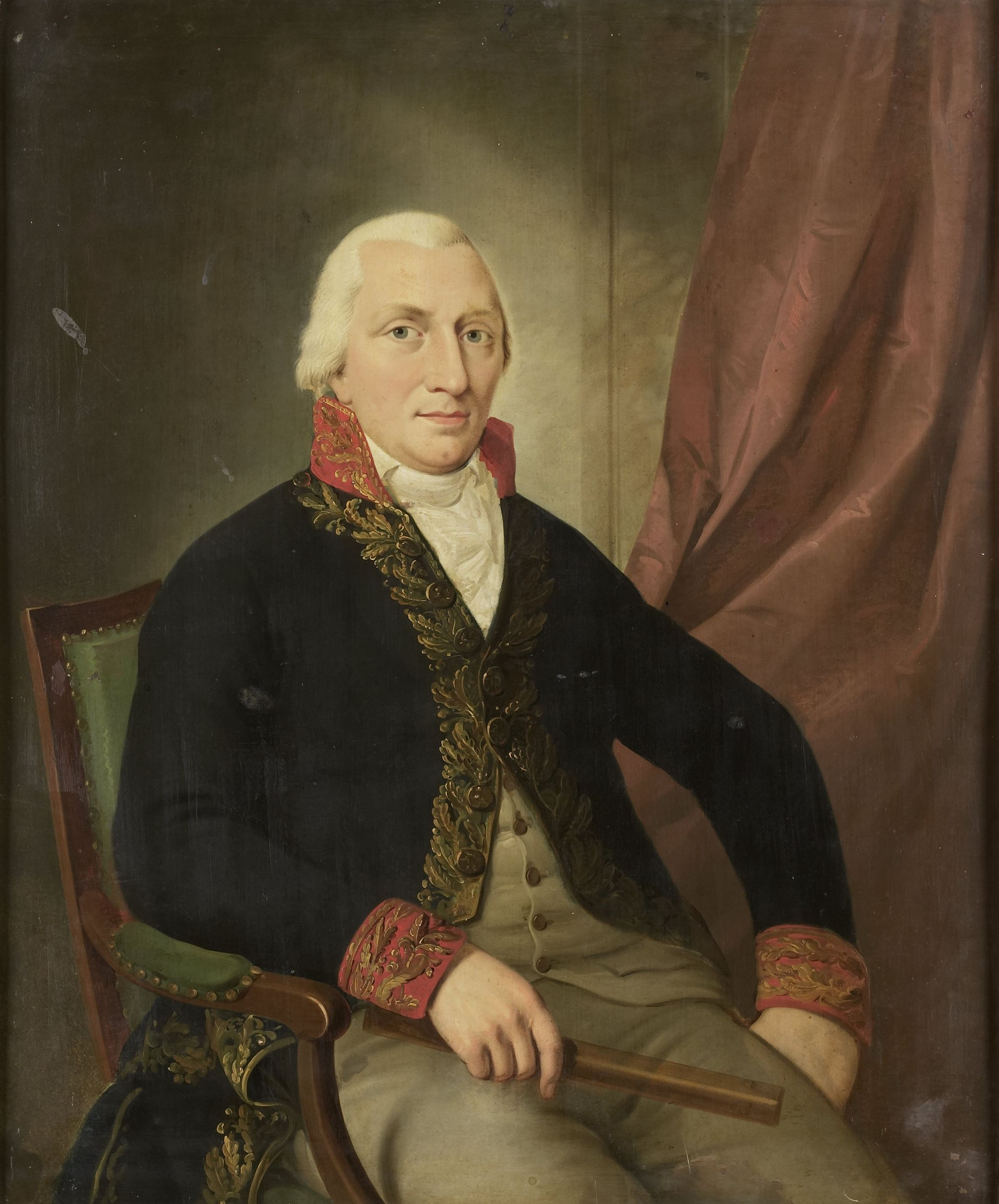
- Anonymous portrait, c. 1805–1810

Governor-General of the Dutch East Indies
- In office 19 October 1804 – 14 January 1808
- Appointed by: Batavian Republic
- Monarch: Louis Bonaparte (from 1806)
- Preceded by: Johannes Siberg
- Succeeded by: Herman Willem Daendels

Personal details
- Born: Unknown date, 1761; Bremen, Dutch Republic
- Died: 7 January 1810 (aged 48–49); Haarlem, Batavian Republic

Albertus Henricus Wiese (1761 – 7 January 1810) was a Dutch colonial administrator who served as the governor-general of the Dutch East Indies from 1805 (Note: Governor general of the Dutch East Indies under French interregnum in 1806 following the proclamation of the Kingdom of Holland.) to 1808, during which time the Dutch Republic became, during the French Revolutionary and Napoleonic Wars, first the Batavian Republic and then the Kingdom of Holland. The Dutch East Indies were subject to attacks and blockades by British forces, while native kings and princes took the opportunity of troubled times to reassert themselves. Weakness of control from the homeland led to a growth of corruption, nepotism and lawlessness in the Dutch East Indies.

Albert Wiese was born in Bremen (in present-day Germany) in 1761. He served as governor-general during the last years of the Batavian Republic and the early years of the Kingdom of Holland. During his time in office the Royal Navy engaged in the Java campaign of 1806–1807, annihilating a Dutch naval squadron under Vice-Admiral Pieter Hartsinck. To reassert control, the Dutch government sent Herman Willem Daendels, who promptly took over from Wiese and prepared for a potential British invasion. A future Governor-General, and Minister for the Colonies, Johannes van den Bosch, was adjutant-general under Governor-General Wiese.

Political offices
Preceded by Johannes Siberg	Governor-General of the Dutch East Indies; 1805–1808	Succeeded by Herman Willem Daendels
