= Abraham van Riebeeck =

Dutch colonial administrator (1653–1713)

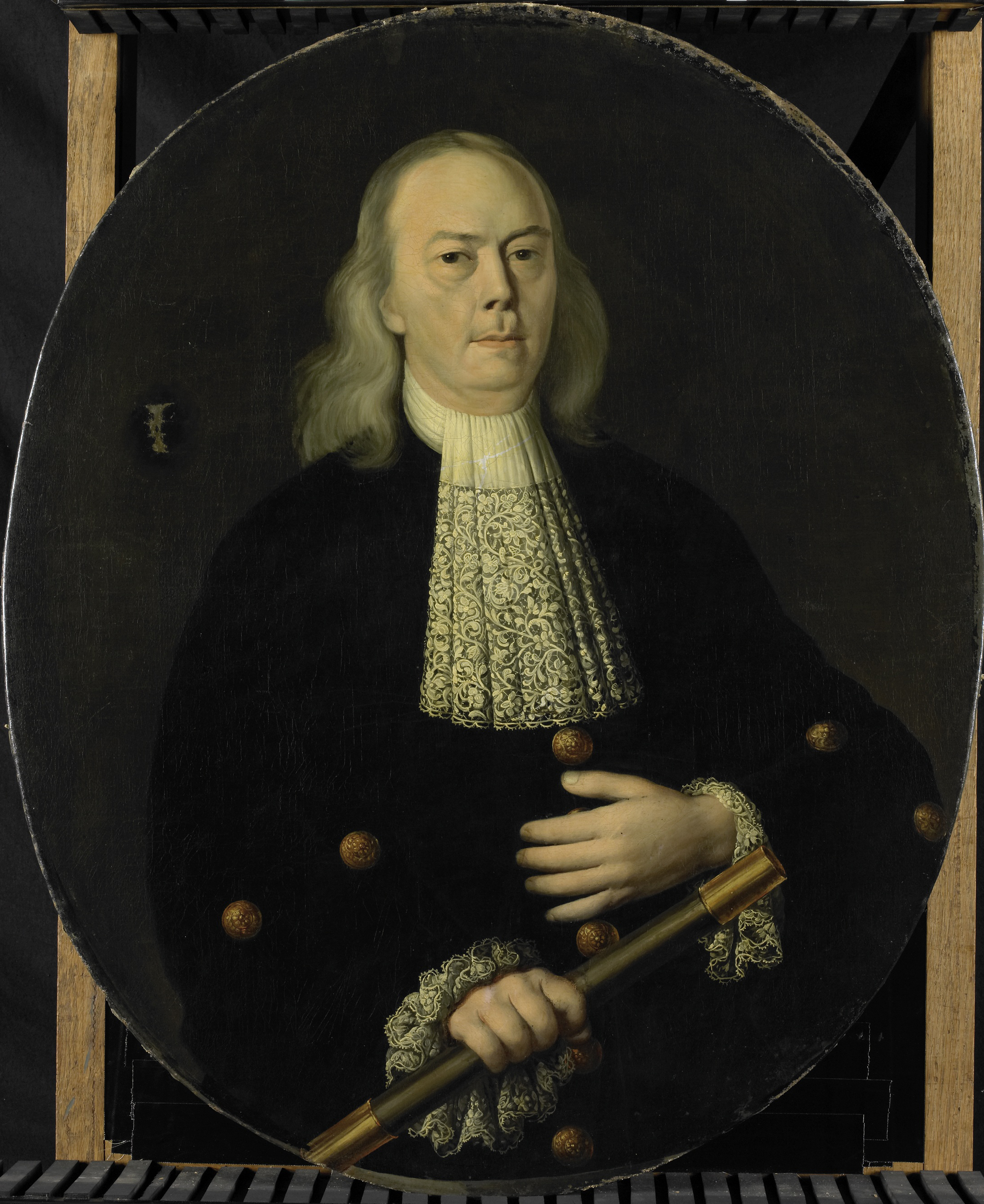

Governor-General of the Dutch East Indies
- In office 30 October 1709 – 17 November 1713
- Preceded by: Joan van Hoorn
- Succeeded by: Christoffel van Swoll

Personal details
- Born: 18 October 1653 Castle of Good Hope, Dutch Cape Colony
- Died: 17 November 1713 (aged 60) Batavia, Dutch East Indies
- Spouse: Elisabeth van Oosten
- Children: 6
- Parent(s): Jan van Riebeeck; Maria van Riebeeck

Abraham van Riebeeck (Dutch pronunciation: [ˈaːbraːɦɑɱ vɑn ˈribeːk]; 18 October 1653 – 17 November 1713) was a merchant with the Dutch East India Company and the Governor-General of the Dutch East Indies from 1709 to 1713.

== Biography ==
Abraham van Riebeeck was born on 18 October 1653 in the Dutch Cape Colony (present-day South Africa). His father was Jan van Riebeeck, commander of the Cape, and his mother was Maria van Riebeeck. When his father moved to Batavia in the Dutch East Indies (present-day Indonesia) in 1662, he sent Van Riebeeck and his brother to Holland. He studied law at Leiden University from 1673 to 1676.

After his studies, he became a merchant with the Dutch East India Company and travelled on the ship De Vrijheyt to Batavia, where he arrived 1677.

He married Elisabeth van Oosten in 1678. They had six children, Johanna Maria (1679–1759), Johannes (1691–1735), Elisabeth (1693–1723), and three others who died in their childhood.

He was Governor-General of the Dutch East Indies from 1709 until his death in 1713. He was a keen explorer, who undertook several smaller and a few larger voyages in the Indies. In 1712, he managed to land in Palabuhanratu and grow coffee plants with success.

== Death ==
After he became the first person to reach the summit of Tangkuban Perahu, Van Riebeeck contracted dysentery on his way home. He was unable to recover from the disease and died on 17 November 1713 in Batavia in the Dutch East Indies.

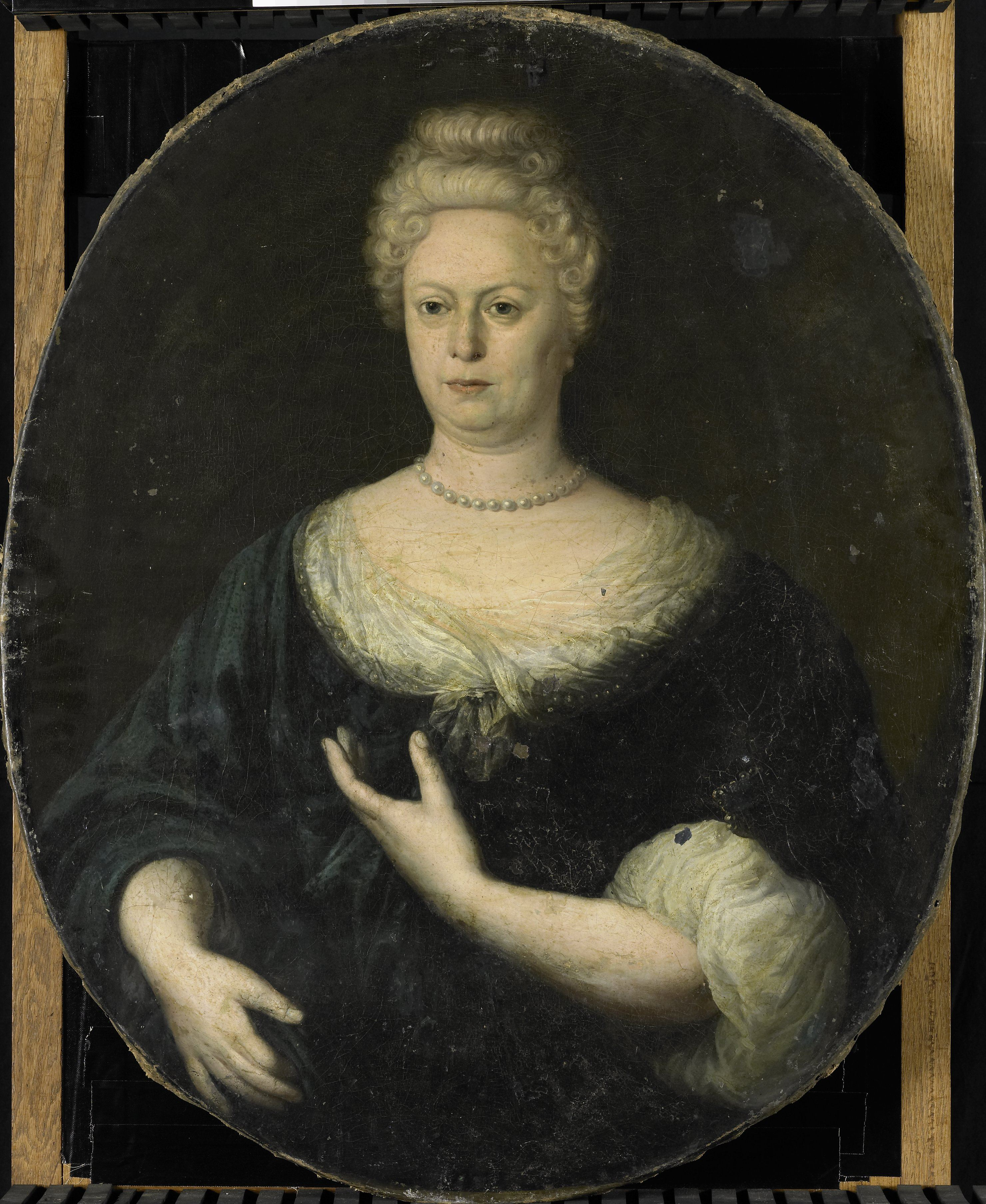
Elisabeth van Oosten, Van Riebeeck's wife

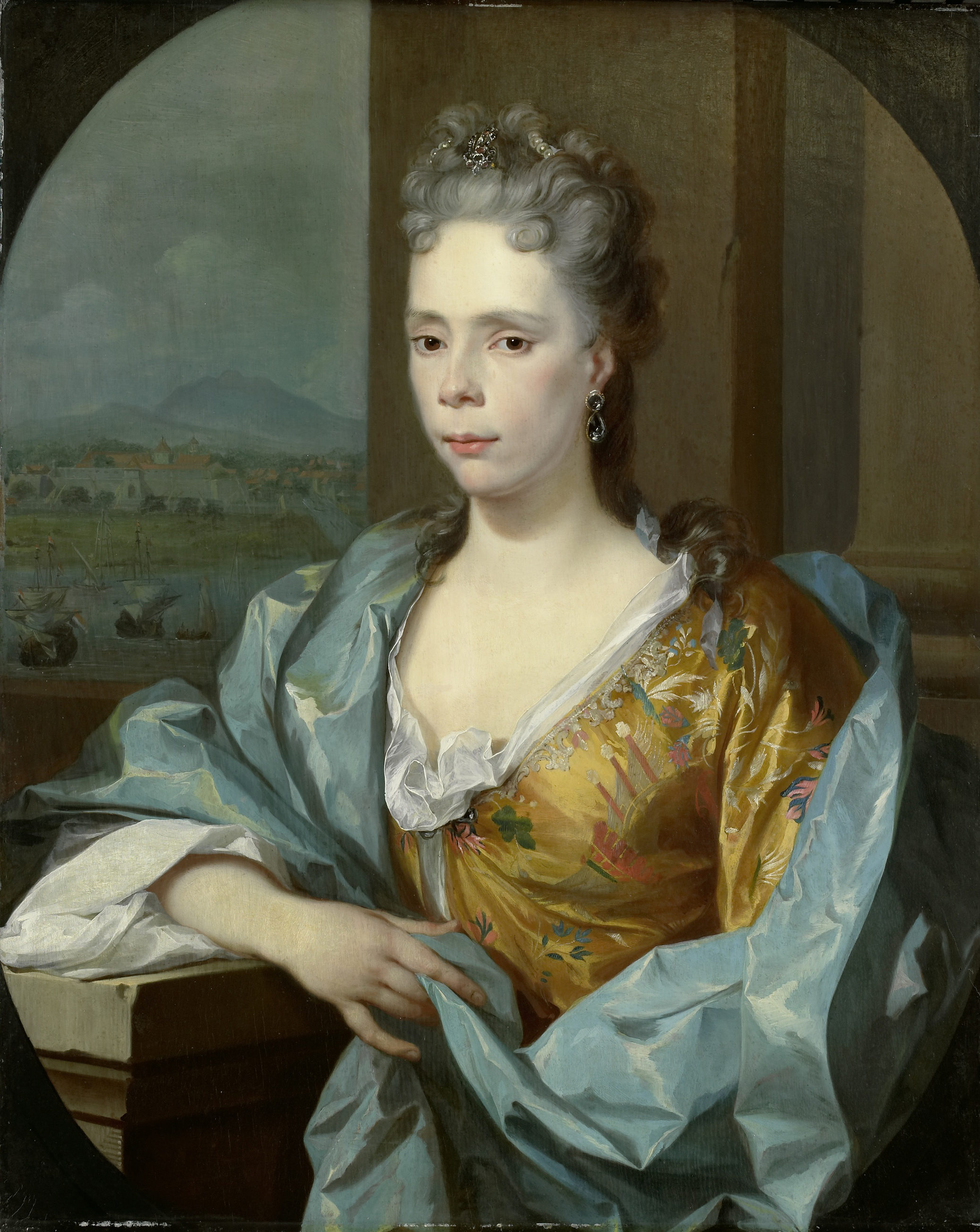
Elisabeth van Riebeeck, Van Riebeeck's daughter
