= Hendrick Zwaardecroon =

Governor-General of the Dutch East Indies

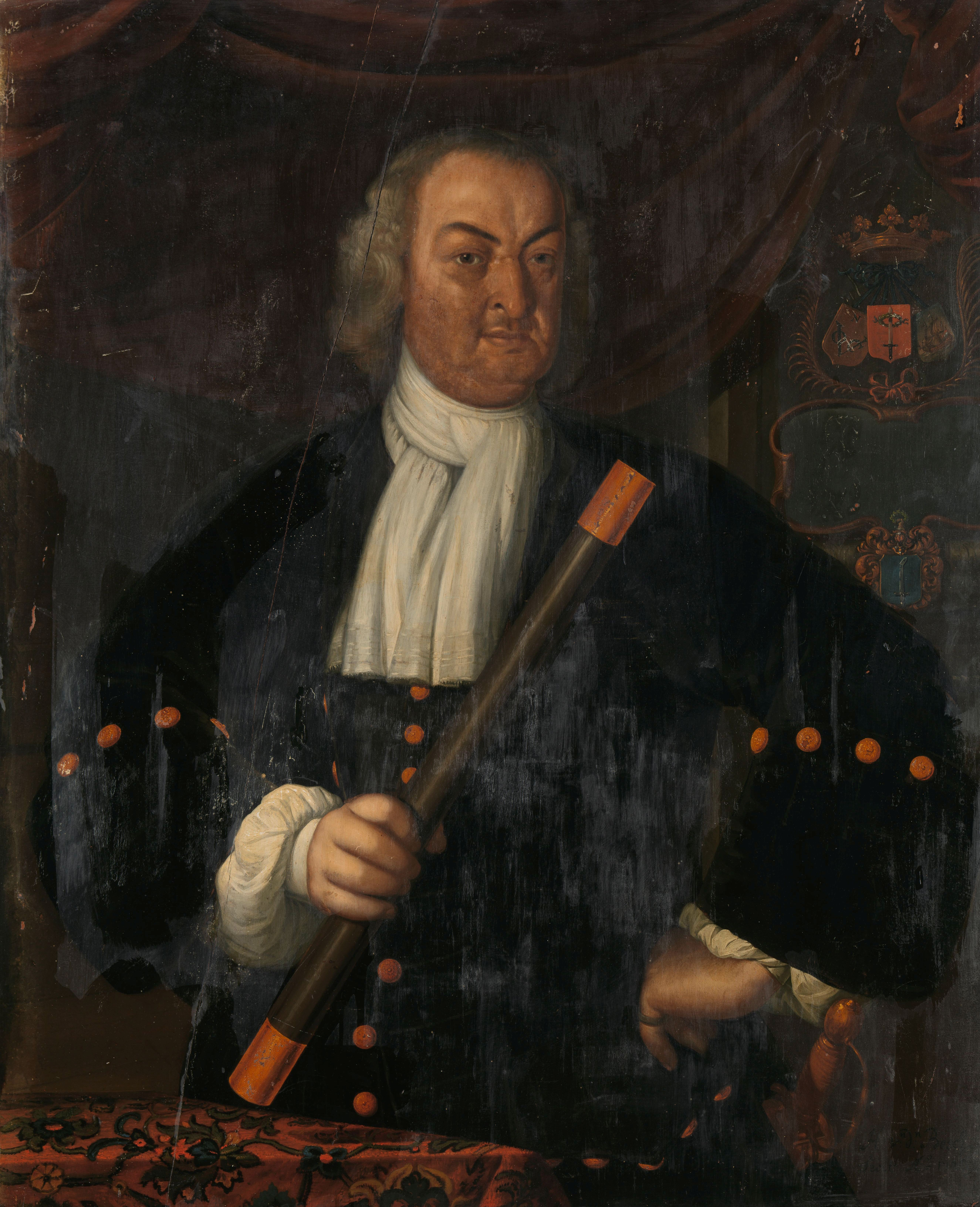

Governor-General of the Dutch East Indies
- In office 13 November 1718 – 8 July 1725
- Preceded by: Christoffel van Swoll
- Succeeded by: Mattheus de Haan

Personal details
- Born: 26 January 1667 Rotterdam, Dutch Republic
- Died: 12 August 1728 (aged 61) Batavia, Dutch East Indies (present-day Indonesia)

Hendrick or Henricus Zwaardecroon (26 January 1667 – 12 August 1728) was Governor-General of the Dutch East Indies from 1718 until 1725.

== Early career ==
Zwaardecroon left for the East Indies as a midshipman aboard the Purmer in December 1684 and arrived in Batavia in October 1685. During the trip he had several times been employed as secretary to Commissioner-General Hendrik van Rheede, which enabled him to make quick progress in his career with the Dutch East India Company (VOC). In 1686 he became Bookkeeper (boekhouder) and subsequently Underbuyer (onderkoopman). In 1694, he was promoted to Buyer (koopman) and in 1694 to Senior Buyer (opperkoopman). In the same year he was appointed Commander (commandeur) in Jafnapatham in Ceylon. He was Commissioner (commissaris) on the Malabar Coast and acting Governor of Ceylon in 1697. He became, in 1703, Secretary to the High Government of the Indies (Hoge Regering) in Batavia, and in 1704, through the influence of the Governor-General, Joan van Hoorn, an extraordinary member of the Dutch Council of the Indies (Raad van de Indië). Through that membership, and later because the Governor-General Christoffel van Swoll had been trying to get him removed from the council, preferably by promotion elsewhere, it took until 1715 before the Lords Seventeen (Heren XVII) named him as full member (gewoon lid).

== Governor-general of the Dutch East Indies ==
The day after the death of Christoffel van Swoll, on 12 November 1718, Zwaardecroon was named Governor-General. Only on 10 September 1720, was he confirmed in this post. His dismissal, by his own desire, came on 16 October 1724, though he handed the actual office to Mattheus de Haan only on 8 July 1725.

During his term of office, Zwaardecroon had to deal with a lot of unrest in Batavia, including arson in the dockyards and an attack on the gunpowder stores. The wealthy Pieter Eberveld, had inherited some land from his father. The government laid claim to a part of this estate. Eberveld planned an attack on the Dutchmen but some of his slaves warned the government and the attack was thwarted. He confessed on the rack and was condemned to death, along with other plotters. His house was destroyed and a wall erected around where it had stood. His head was stuck on a lance and attached to the wall. A stone with an inscription was erected, indicating that never again would anything be built on that spot. It was only removed during the Japanese occupation (World War II).

Zwaardecrood always took great interest in developing new products. He encouraged coffee-planting in Priangan on Java meaning coffee production grew quickly. From 1723 on, the whole of the harvest had to be delivered to the Company. Zwaardecroon then introduced silk production to Java as well as the production of vegetable dyes. The silk production was not very successful. In 1772 he re-established the Chinese tea trade, which had previously been disrupted.

In 1719, Pakubuwono I of Kartasura in East Java died and was succeeded by his son, Amangkurat IV. Two of his brothers did not recognise his succession and rose in revolt, attacking Kartasura. This was repulsed by the Dutch occupying troops, but Zwaardecroon felt himself compelled to send more troops to East Java. The revolt was put down by 1723, but it took until 1752 until real peace was restored in the area. (Second Javanese War of Succession 1719 - 1723). Zwaardecroon took action against private traders, and thus got better relations with local Company top shareholders (Bewindhouders). In 1726, he had 26 Company servants brought to Batavia on charges of corruption.

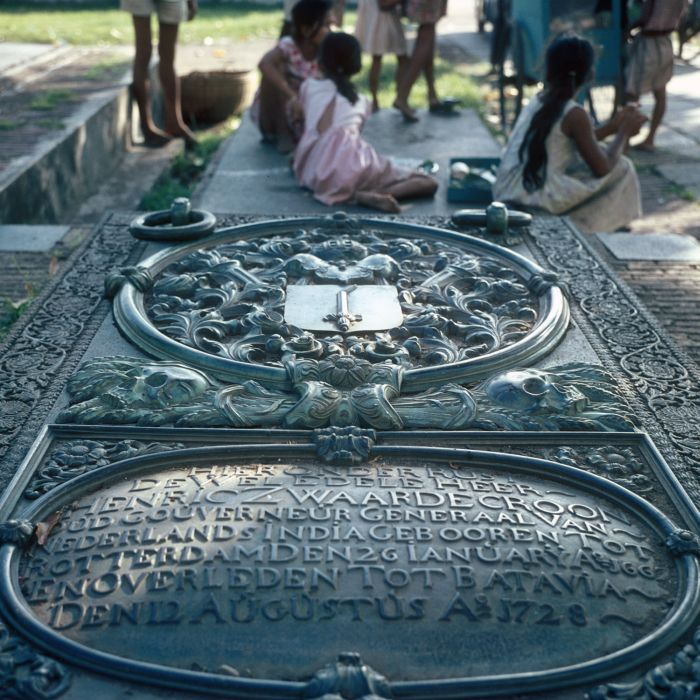
Swaardecroon's resting place

Zwaardecroon died on 12 August 1728 in his estate at Kaduang near Batavia. He said he felt more at home with ordinary townsfolk, and so at his request he was not buried with his predecessors as Governor-General, but in the graveyard of the Portuguese Church Outside the Walls at Batavia (Portuguese Buitenkerk) in Batavia, where his grave can still be visited.
