= Herman Willem Daendels =

Dutch military officer and colonial administrator (1762–1818)

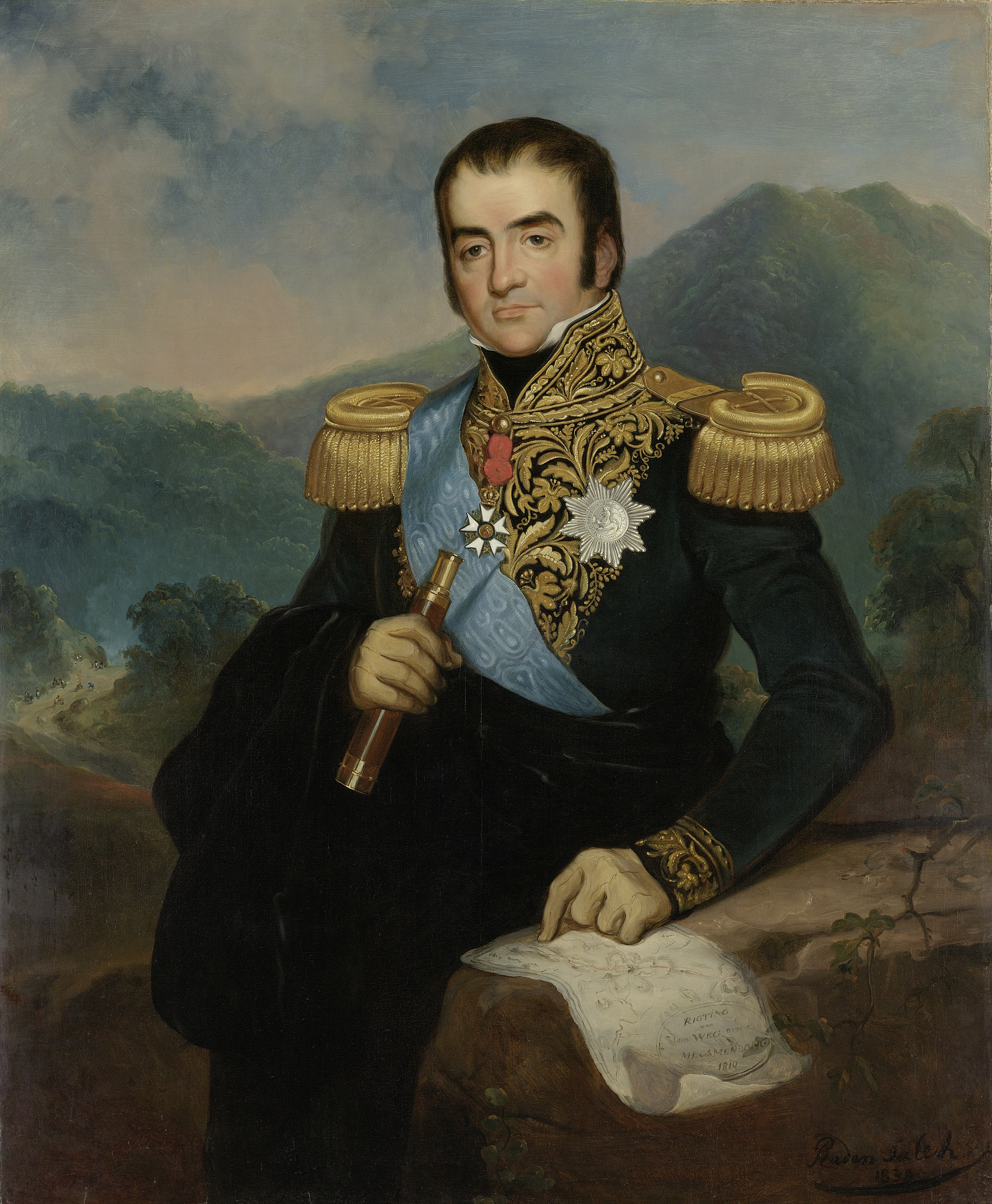
- Portrait by Raden Saleh, 1838

Governor-General of the Dutch Gold Coast
- In office 11 March 1816 – 2 May 1818
- Monarch: William I
- Preceded by: Abraham de Veer (as Commandant‑General)
- Succeeded by: Frans Christiaan Eberhard Oldenburg (as Commander)

Governor-General of the Dutch East Indies
- In office 14 January 1808 – 15 May 1811
- Monarchs: Louis Bonaparte; Napoleon Bonaparte
- Preceded by: Albertus Henricus Wiese
- Succeeded by: Jan Willem Janssens

Personal details
- Born: 21 October 1762 Hattem, Dutch Republic
- Died: 2 May 1818 (aged 55) Elmina, Dutch Gold Coast (present‑day Ghana)
- Resting place: Dutch Cemetery, Elmina
- Party: Patriots faction

Military service
- Allegiance: French First Republic; First French Empire; Batavian Republic; Kingdom of Holland
- Branch/service: Grande Armée
- Years of service: 1785–1813
- Rank: Major general
- Commands: Batavian Legion
- Battles/wars: Patriot Revolt; Prussian invasion of Holland; Defence of Amsterdam; War of the First Coalition; Flanders campaign; Batavian Revolution; War of the Second Coalition; Battle of Callantsoog; Battle of Krabbendam; Battle of Bergen; Battle of Alkmaar; Battle of Castricum; War of the Fourth Coalition; Capture of East Frisia; War of the Fifth Coalition; British invasion of the Spice Islands; French invasion of Russia; Battle of Berezina; War of the Sixth Coalition; Siege of Modlin
- Awards: Legion of Honour

Herman Willem Daendels (21 October 1762 – 2 May 1818) was a Dutch military officer and colonial administrator who served as governor-general of the Dutch East Indies from 1808 to 1811.

== Early life ==
Herman Willem Daendels was born on 21 October 1762 in Hattem, Netherlands. His father, Burchard Johan Daendels, served as a mayoral secretary; his mother was Josina Christina Tulleken. Daendels pursued a legal education at the University of Harderwijk and obtained his doctorate on 10 April 1783.

== Political activity ==
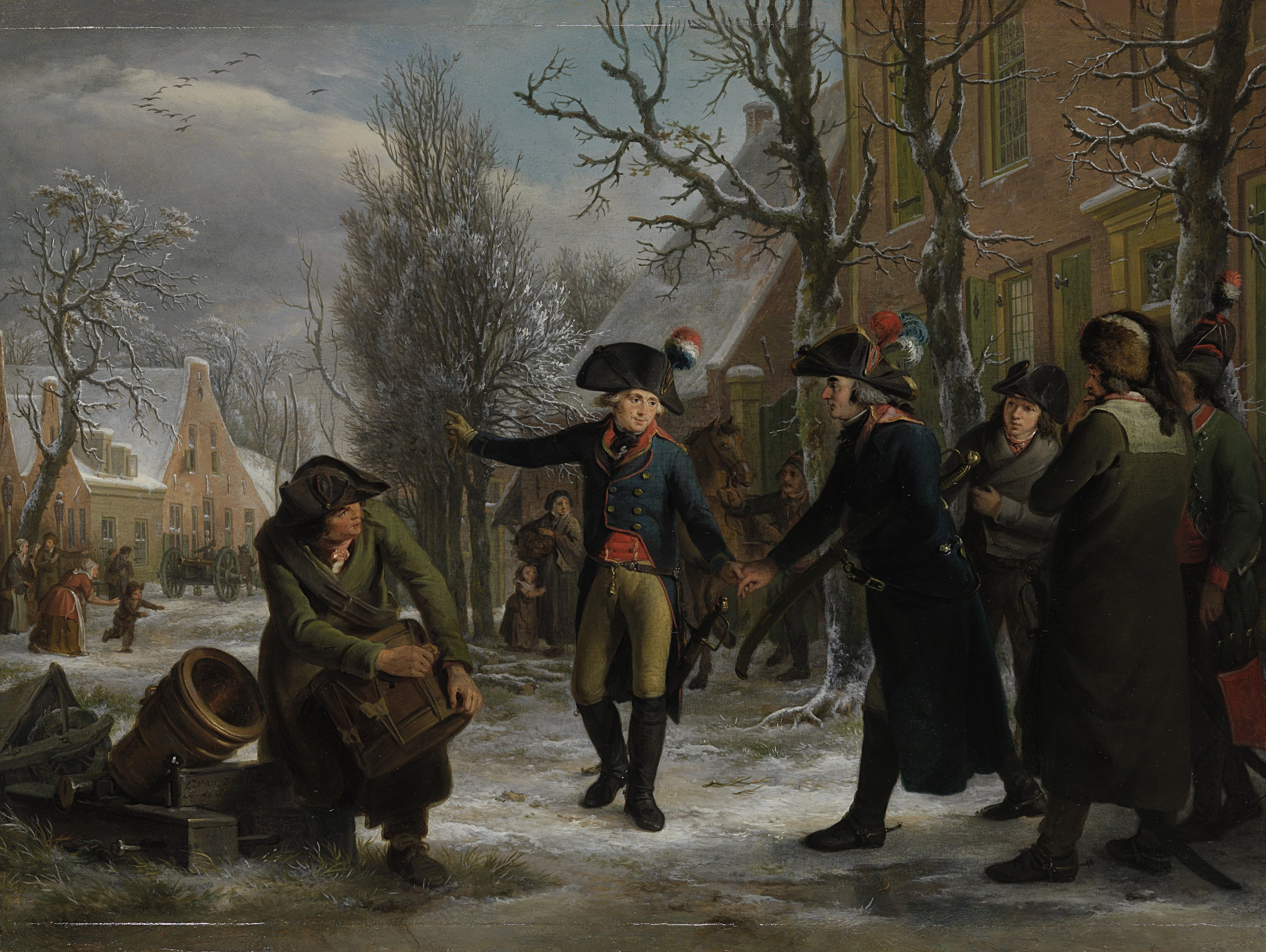
General Daendels Taking Leave of Lieutenant-Colonel Krayenhoff (1795)

In 1785, Daendels aligned himself with the Patriots, a faction gaining control in various Dutch cities. In September 1786, he unsuccessfully defended the town of Hattem against troops loyal to the stadholder. The following year, in September 1787, Daendels played a role in the defense of Amsterdam against the invading Prussian army, which aimed to reinstate William V of Orange. Subsequently, when William V regained power, Daendels fled to French Flanders to evade a death sentence resulting from the Patriots' defeat. During this time, he closely observed the French Revolution unfolding.

In 1794, Daendels returned to the Netherlands as a general in the French revolutionary army, serving under General Charles Pichegru and commanding the Batavian Legion. His troops entered the Dutch Republic after crossing frozen rivers in January 1795. The Batavian Republic was subsequently founded by citizen committees. He actively supported the elevation of unitarian politician Pieter Vreede to power through a coup d'état on 25 January 1798. This move was motivated by dissatisfaction with the conservative-moderate majority in parliament, which hindered the development of a more democratic and centralized constitution. However, Vreede's rule did not yield the anticipated outcomes, leading to another coup d'état against him on 14 June 1798, in which Daendels played a role. In the Batavian Republic, Daendels held various political positions but was compelled to resign after failing to avert the Anglo-Russian invasion of Holland in 1799. He later pursued farming in Heerde, Gelderland.

== Military and colonial career ==
=== Governor-general of the Dutch East Indies ===
Java Great Post Road, commissioned by Daendels

Louis Bonaparte appointed Daendels as colonel-general in 1806 and governor-general of the Dutch East Indies in 1807. Daendels arrived in Batavia (now Jakarta) on 5 January 1808 after a lengthy voyage, assuming the role previously held by Albertus Henricus Wiese. His primary objective was to defend the Dutch East Indies from British attacks.

During his tenure, Daendels undertook various infrastructure projects. He established new hospitals and military barracks, constructed arms factories in Surabaya and Semarang, and founded a military college in Batavia. The Castle in Batavia was dismantled and replaced by a new fort in Meester Cornelis (Jatinegara). At the same time, Fort Lodewijk (Fort Louis) was built in Surabaya. Additionally, he relocated the central government from Old Batavia to Weltevreden and commissioned the construction of a palace in Paradeplaats. His most renowned achievement was the Great Post Road (Indonesian: Jalan Raya Pos) that spanned northern Java from Anyer to Panarukan. Today, this road serves as the main thoroughfare on the island, known as Jalur Pantura (Pantai Utara) (Translated: Northern Coast Road). Notably, the construction of this thousand-kilometer road in a single year resulted in the deaths of numerous Javanese forced laborers.

Daendels adopted a stern stance towards Javanese rulers, causing them to align themselves with the British against the Dutch. He also imposed forced labor (Rodi) on the population of Java, which sparked rebellious incidents like the ones in Cadas Pangeran, West Java.

Opinions differ regarding the extent to which Daendels improved the efficiency of the local bureaucracy and curbed corruption, although he accumulated personal wealth during his time in office.

Despite his efforts to bolster defenses, Daendels was unsuccessful in halting the British invasion of the Spice Islands in 1810.

=== General in Napoleon's Grande Armée ===
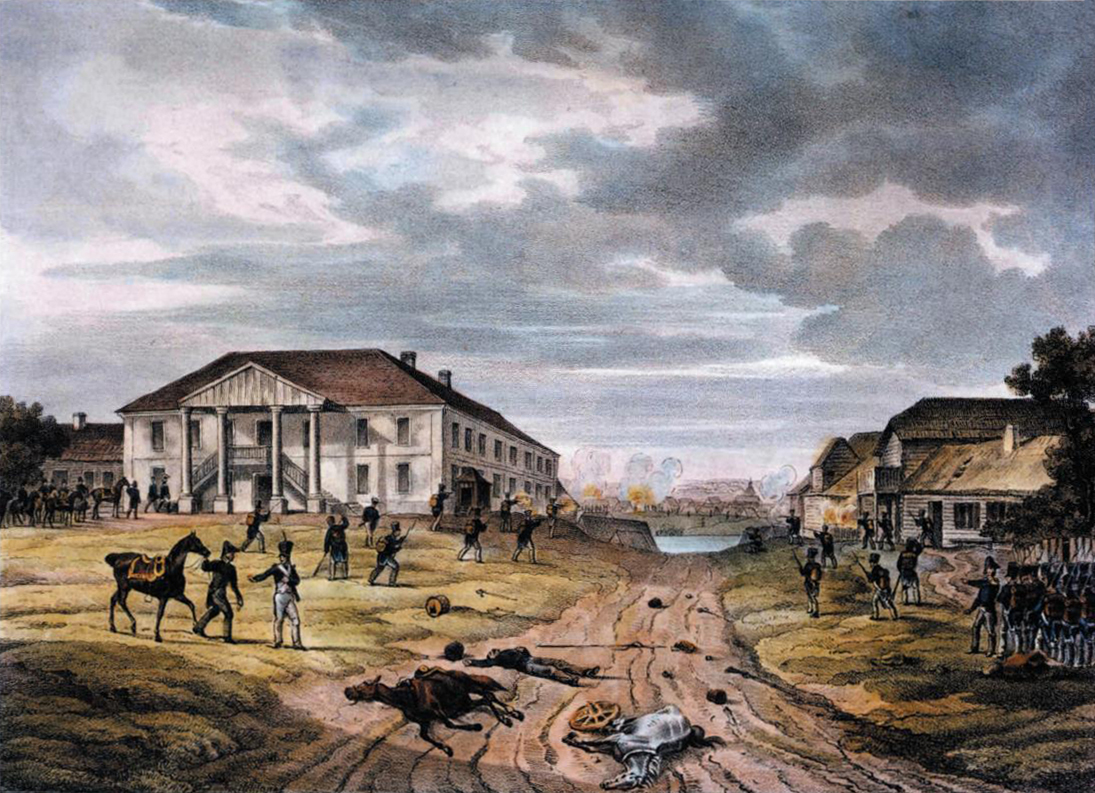
View on Beshenkovichi, From J. North (2005) Napoleon's Army in Russia: The Illustrated Memoirs of Albrecht Adam – 1812. Pen & Sword Books. Plate 21.

During the incorporation of the Kingdom of Holland into France in 1810, Daendels returned to Holland and resided in Paris by November 1811. He was appointed as a divisional general (major general) and assumed command of the 26th Division of the Grande Armée. This division consisted of troops from Baden, Hesse-Darmstadt, and Berg. In mid-March 1812, Daendels was appointed as the commander of the 26th Division, serving under Marshal Victor as part of IX Corps, which acted as a reserve.

In August, Victor received orders to march eastward, joining the Badeners in the Russian campaign 1812. Daendels arrived in Vilnius on 8 and 15 September, subsequently reaching Minsk. On 11 October, his division moved to Babinovichi, and on 20 October, they received orders to proceed to Vitebsk. By 27 October, they had occupied the nearby town of Beshenkovichi. The following day, temperatures dropped below zero. The supplies in Vitebsk were lost when the Russian army captured the city, and it began to snow on 29 October.

On 11 November, Daendels and the rearguard arrived in Chashniki, approximately 90 km southwest of their previous location. On 14 November, during the battle of Smoliani, the French suffered the loss of 3,000 men against General Peter Wittgenstein, and heavy snowfall of about 1.5 meters occurred that day. Four days later, the supplies in Minsk were also lost when Pavel Chichagov captured the city.

On 24 November, Daendels skirmished with some Russians but reunited with the rest of the French army near Bobr. Subsequently, all the French soldiers proceeded to Borisov, where the Russian army destroyed a crucial bridge crossing the Berezina River. Daendels' division, consisting of 4,000 men, played a decisive role in the Battle of Berezina.

From February 1813 until December 1813, General Daendels commanded Polish forces defending the Modlin Fortress, located northwest of Warsaw. It was the final French stronghold along the Vistula to surrender.

=== Governor-general of the Dutch Gold Coast ===
Following the downfall of Napoleon, concerns arose within the Dutch government, including King William I, regarding the potential influence and oppositional leadership of Daendels. To prevent this, he was appointed as the governor-general of the Dutch Gold Coast (now part of Ghana) and effectively prohibited from returning to the Netherlands. After the abolition of the Atlantic slave trade, Daendels aimed to revitalize the neglected Dutch territories into an African plantation colony focused on legitimate business. Leveraging his experience from the East Indies, he devised ambitious infrastructure projects, such as a comprehensive road network with a primary route connecting Elmina and Kumasi in Ashanti. The Dutch government granted him considerable autonomy and a substantial budget to execute his plans. Simultaneously, Daendels viewed his governorship as an opportunity to establish a personal monopoly on business in the Dutch Gold Coast.

In 1817, the British accused Daendels of supporting and facilitating the Atlantic slave trade, despite its prohibition by both the British and Dutch authorities, from his position at the Elmina fort, which was then under Dutch control. On 5 March 1817, the British governor of Cape Coast, John Smith, wrote to the African Committee in Parliament in London, stating, "We deem it our duty to inform you of the conduct of General Daendels, who is acting independent of his Government. Portuguese vessels were furnished with canoes, and Spaniards were supplied with water. At the beginning of last month, a large Spanish ship was four days at anchor in Elmina roads, receiving water and bartering dollars for goods suited for the purchase of slaves."

None of Daendels' infrastructure plans came to fruition, as he succumbed to malaria on 2 May 1818 while in the castle of St. George d'Elmina, which served as the Dutch seat of government. His body was interred in the central tomb at the Dutch cemetery in Elmina. He had been in the country less than two years.

Political offices
Preceded by Abraham de Veer as Commandant-General	Governor-General of the Dutch Gold Coast; 1816–1818	Succeeded by Frans Christiaan Eberhard Oldenburg as Commander
Preceded by Albertus Henricus Wiese	Governor-General of the Dutch East Indies; 1808–1811	Succeeded by Jan Willem Janssens
