= Jean Chrétien Baud =

Dutch politician (1789–1859)

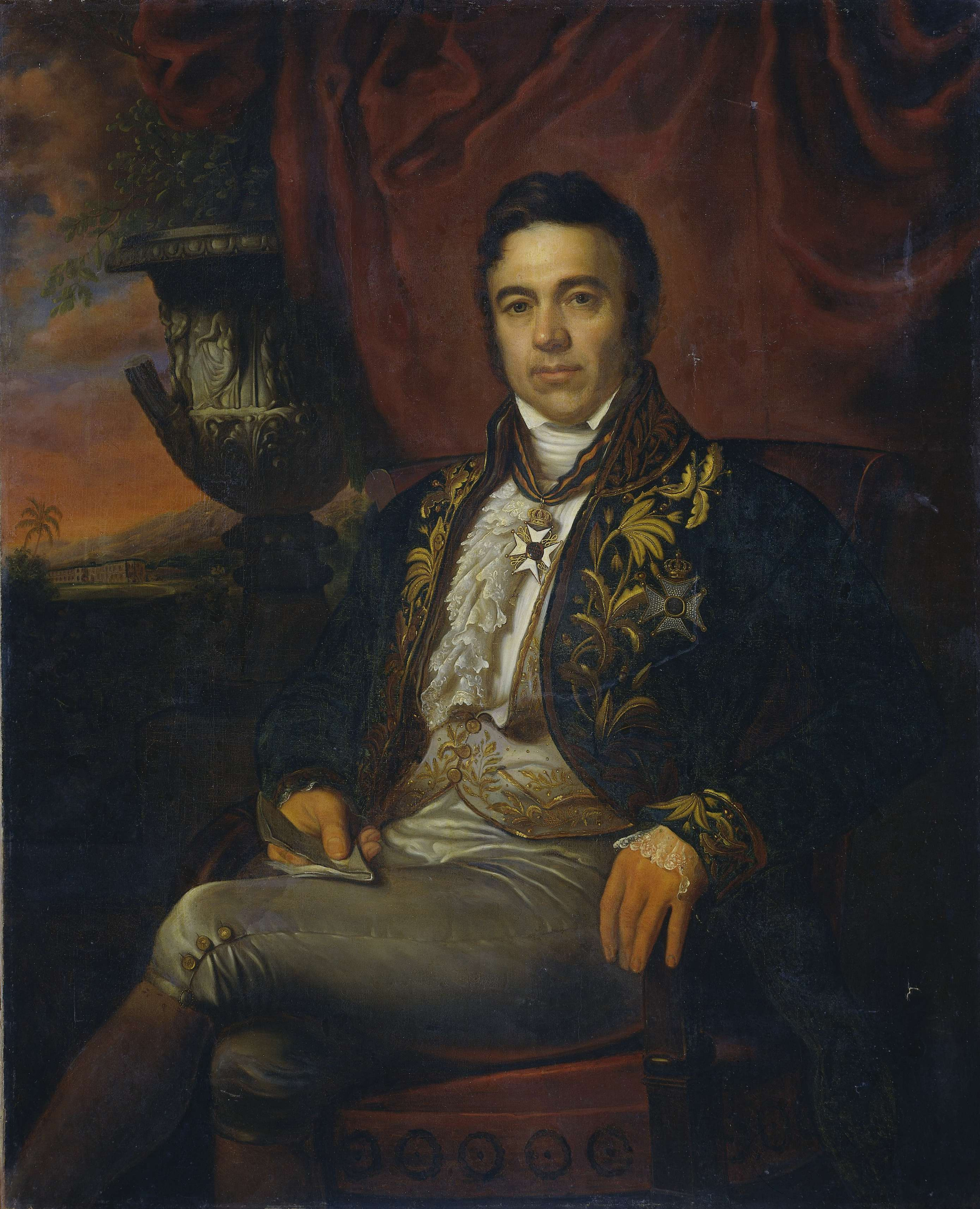
- Portrait by Raden Saleh, 1835

Minister of Colonial Affairs
- In office 1 January 1840 – 25 March 1848
- Monarchs: William I; William II
- Preceded by: Johannes van den Bosch
- Succeeded by: Julius Constantijn Rijk

Governor-General of the Dutch East Indies
- In office 2 July 1833 – 29 February 1836
- Monarch: William I
- Preceded by: Johannes van den Bosch
- Succeeded by: Dominique Jacques de Eerens

Personal details
- Born: 23 October 1789 The Hague, Dutch Republic
- Died: 27 June 1859 (aged 69) The Hague, Netherlands

Jean Chrétien, Baron Baud (23 October 1789 – 27 June 1859) was Governor-General of the Dutch East Indies from 1833 until 1836.

== Biography ==
Baud was born in the Hague, on 23 October 1789. Originally a civil servant and politician who served under William I and William II of the Netherlands, Baud zoomed through the ranks of the civil service until he reached the post of Vice President of the Council for the Dutch East Indies. Following Johannes van den Bosch, as acting Governor-General and, later, Minister for the Colonies, he was an avid defender of the Dutch Colonial policy, the cultuurstelsel, which required a quota of profitable crops to be dedicated to export.

He was succeed in 1836 by Dominique Jacques de Eerens. He became Minister of the Marine in 1840 and Minister for the Colonies from that year until 1848. After 1848, he was for a few years a conservative member for Rotterdam of the House of Representatives. He died in the Hague, on 27 June 1859, aged 69, from unknown causes.

Political offices
Preceded by Johannes van den Bosch	Minister of Colonial Affairs; 1840–1848	Succeeded by Julius Constantijn Rijk
Preceded by Johannes van den Bosch	Governor-General of the Dutch East Indies; 1833–1836	Succeeded by Dominique Jacques de Eerens
Dutch nobility
New creation	Baron Baud; 1858–1859	Succeeded by Jan Michiel Baud
