= Pieter Merkus =

Dutch colonial administrator

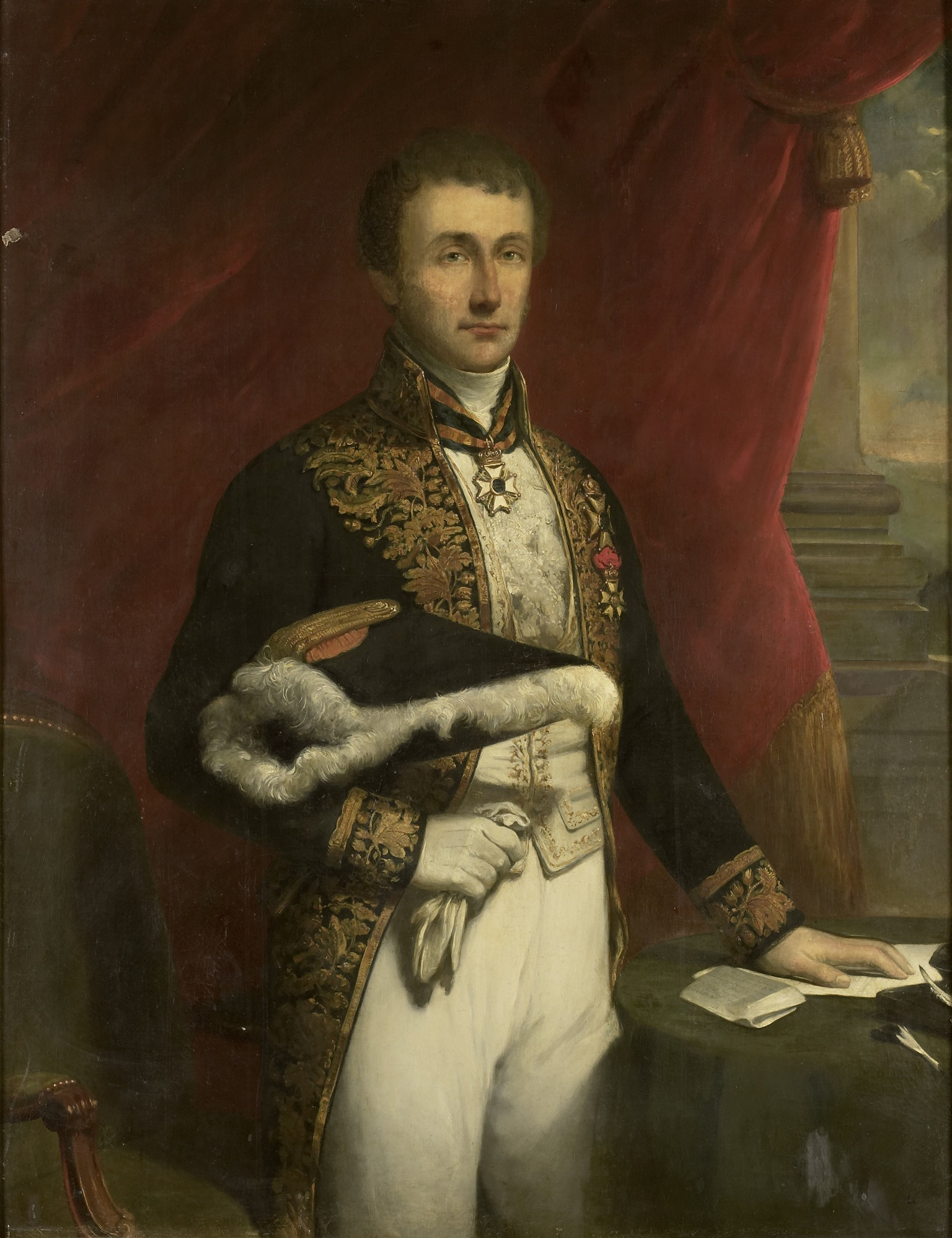
- Portrait by Jan Willem Pieneman

Governor-General of the Dutch East Indies
- In office 1841–1844
- Preceded by: Carel Sirardus Willem van Hogendorp
- Succeeded by: Joan Cornelis Reynst

Personal details
- Born: 18 March 1787 Naarden, Dutch Republic
- Died: 2 August 1844 (aged 57) Surabaya, Dutch East Indies

Pieter Merkus (18 March 1787 – 2 August 1844) was a Dutch colonial administrator and Governor-General of the Dutch East Indies from 1841 to 1844. He also served as governor of the Molucca Islands.

Political offices
Preceded by Carel Sirardus Willem van Hogendorp	Governor-General of the Dutch East Indies; 1841–1844	Succeeded by Joan Cornelis Reynst
