= Joan Cornelis Reynst =

Dutch politician (1798–1871)

Governor-General of the Dutch East Indies
- In office 5 August 1844 – 30 September 1845
- Monarch: William II
- Preceded by: Pieter Merkus
- Succeeded by: Jan Jacob Rochussen

Personal details
- Born: 23 January 1798 Larenstein, near Velp, Batavian Republic
- Died: 11 October 1871 (aged 73) The Hague, Netherlands

Joan Cornelis Reynst (23 January 1798 – 11 October 1871), member of the Reynst family, was acting Governor-General of the Dutch East Indies in 1844–1845.

Political offices
Preceded by Pieter Merkus	Governor-General of the Dutch East Indies; 1844–1845	Succeeded by Jan Jacob Rochussen
