= Constantin Ranst de Jonge =

Dutch businessman

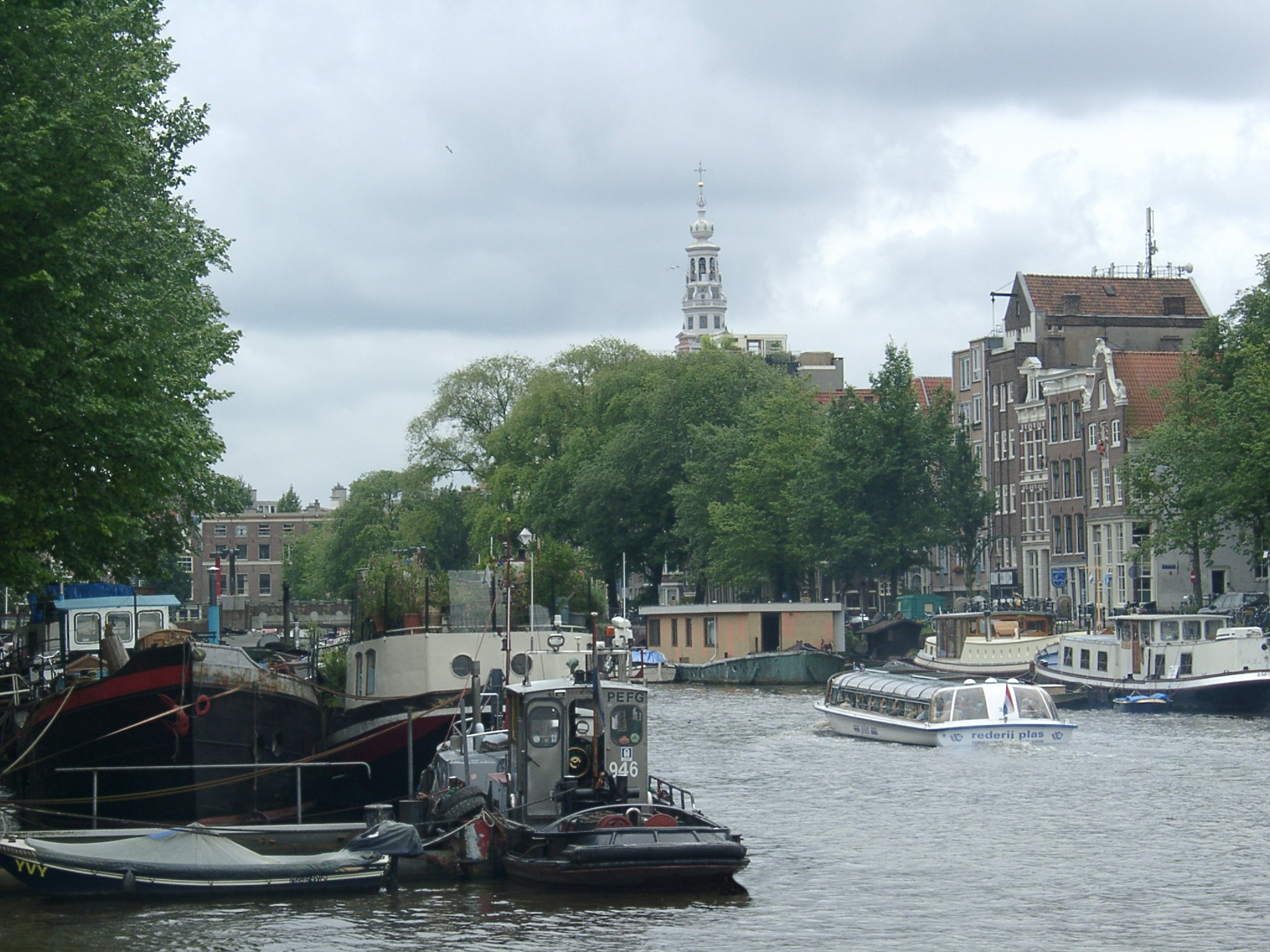
Oudeschans with Zuiderkerk

Constanti(j)n Ranst de Jonge (28 October 1635 – 10 January 1714) was a Dutch businessman employed by the Dutch East India Company (VOC) who was chief of the trading posts in Tonkin and Dutch Bengal and three times opperhoofd of Dejima in Japan.

== Ranst Family ==
Ranst was born in Amsterdam as the son of Hieronimus Rans(t) (1607–1660) and Barbara Carel. The Ranst family had originated in Bruges, but had moved to Middelburg and Amsterdam after 1585. Hieronimus and Barbara lived near the port, on Oude Schans 74/76, in a house called The Two Tigers. The couple had at least eleven children; four died young. In 1633 Hieronimus invested in digging peat near Smilde, in 1635 he bought property in the Schermer, when the polder was drained, and in 1638 he was involved in whaling. In 1640 he became a guardian over the children of Gommer Spranger. In 1644 Hieronimus owned a mansion designed by Philips Vingboons in the Purmer near Edam; in 1650 his brother-in-law, Willem Boreel, became ambassador in Venice.

== Constantin Ranst ==
In 1656 Constantin married Hester Hartsinck in Batavia. In March 1659 he arrived in Cape Colony and met with Jan van Riebeeck and Johan Bax (van Herentals). He was successively chief of Tonkin, 1665–1667, opperhoofd on Deshima, 1667–1668, extraordinary council in Batavia (1668), director of Bengal (1669–1673), ordinary council (1675) in Batavia, opperhoofd in Deshima 1683–1684, and again from 1686 to 1687.

In 1688 Jacob J. Hinlopen (1668–1698) married his daughter Hester (Bengal, 1671-Amsterdam, 1750) in Ouderkerk aan de Amstel. Ranst lived on Herengracht 527; the house (& seven warehouses on Prinsengracht) were inherited by his grandson Jacob J. Hinlopen. Ranst owned a painting by Rembrandt van Rijn with the adoration of the three kings. His brother Leonard was a member of the vroedschap. Ranst belonged to the 250 wealthiest families in the Netherlands during the Golden Age. He died in Amsterdam.

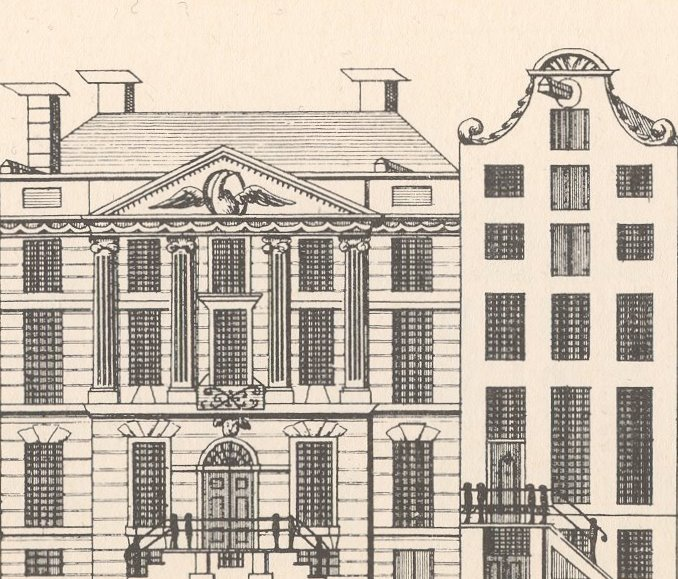
Herengracht 527 and 529

In 1717 the mansion on Herengracht was rented out to czar Peter the Great during his 2nd visit.

== See also ==
- VOC Opperhoofden in Japan

== Literature ==
- 'Constantijn Ranst', in Kees Zandvliet, De 250 rijksten van de Gouden Eeuw (Amsterdam : Rijksmuseum etc., 2006) 131–132.
- Gaastra, F.S. (1985) Constantijn Ranst en de corruptie onder het personeel van de VOC te Bengalen, 1669 - 1673. e.v.a.
- “Constantijn Ranst”. In Groenveld, S., M.E.H.N. Mout, I. Schoffer, Bestuurders en geleerden: opstellen over onderwerpen uit de Nederlandse geschiedenis van de zestiende, zeventiende en achttiende eeuw, aangeboden aan Prof. Dr. J.J. Woltjer bij zijn afscheid als hoogleraar van de Rijksuniversiteit te Leiden Amsterdam: De Bataafsche Leeuw. 1985.

Preceded by Daniel Six	VOC Opperhoofden at Dejima; 6.11.1667 - 25.10.1668	Succeeded by Daniel Six
Preceded by Andreas Cleyer	VOC Opperhoofden at Dejima; 20.10.1682 - 8.11.1683	Succeeded by Hendrick van Buijtenhem
Preceded by Andreas Cleyer	VOC Opperhoofden at Dejima; 5.11.1686 - 25.10.1687	Succeeded by Hendrick van Buijtenhem
