= Johannes Thedens =

Governor-General of the Dutch East Indies

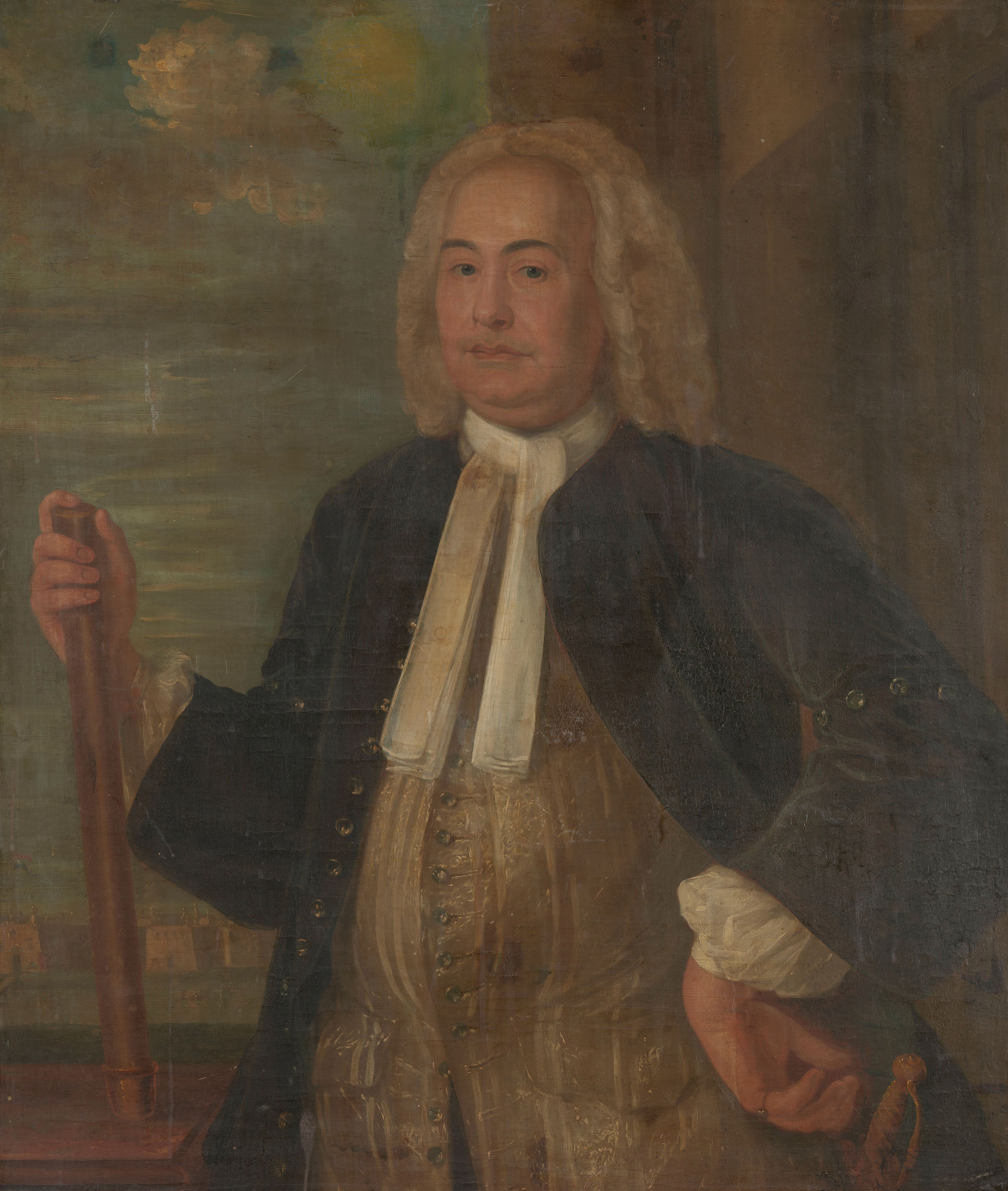
- Johannes Thedens

Governor-General of the Dutch East Indies
- In office 6 November 1741 – 28 May 1743
- Preceded by: Abraham Patras
- Succeeded by: Gustaaf Willem van Imhoff

Personal details
- Born: 1680 Friedrichstadt, Duchy of Schleswig
- Died: 19 March 1748 (aged 67-68) Batavia, Dutch East Indies (present-day Indonesia)

Johannes Thedens (1680 – 19 March 1748) was Governor-General of the Dutch East Indies from 6 November 1741 until 28 May 1743.

Thedens, born in a largely Dutch settlement in Friedrichstadt, Schleswig, sailed on 17 December 1697 as a soldier aboard the Unie to the Dutch East Indies. In 1702 he was appointed to the post of 'Assistant' in the Dutch East India Company and in 1719, to 'Buyer' (koopman). He then progressed (between 1723 and 1725) up through the ranks to 'Chief Buyer' (opperkoopman) then 'Head of Post' (opperhoofd) at Deshima in Japan.

In 1731, he was co-opted to the Council of the Indies and in 1736, he was made a full member (Raad-ordinair of Indie). In 1740 he was appointed by the Directors as a 'First Councillor and Director General' of the Indies. On 6 November 1741, following the dismissal of Adriaan Valckenier (whom he had arrested and placed in prison in the castle at Batavia), he became 'interim' Governor General. He continued in office up to 28 May 1743, and was able to overcome the Chinese insurrection and put the sugar trade on a better footing. He was succeeded by Gustaaf Willem baron van Imhoff. He died in Batavia.

== See also ==
- VOC Opperhoofden in Japan

== Notes ==
Preceded by Joan de Hartogh	VOC Opperhoofd of Dejima; 1723–1725	Succeeded by Hendrik Durven
