= Eduard Grandisson =

Dutch colonial administrator (1798–1879)

Dutch Opperhoofd in Japan
- In office 18 November 1838 – November 1842
- Monarchs: William II; William I
- Governors General: Pieter Merkus; Carel Sirardus Willem van Hogendorp; Dominique Jacques de Eerens
- Preceded by: Johannes Erdewin Niemann
- Succeeded by: Pieter Albert Bik

Personal details
- Born: c. 1798 Batavia, Dutch East Indies
- Died: 26 April 1879 (aged 81) Serang, Dutch East Indies
- Spouse(s): Johanna Carolina Wiltenaer; Augustina Martha Tjoa Nio

Eduard Grandisson (1798 – 26 April 1879) was a colonial administrator in the Dutch East Indies, who served as opperhoofd of the trading post of Dejima in the harbour of Nagasaki between 1838 and 1842.

== Biography ==
Eduard Grandisson was born to Ma Isa and adopted at a young age by Adriaan Wilbert Jorisen and Frederica Florentina Foeijt. It is likely his adoptive parents named him after the character of the same name in the popular Dutch children's novel of the day, De kleine Grandisson, of de gehoorzaame zoon by Maria Geertruid de Cambon-van der Werken.

Grandisson joined the colonial government of the Dutch East Indies, becoming adjunct procurator fiscal in Batavia, and later secretary of the residency of Palembang.

He married Johanna Carolina Wiltenaer in 1823. After her death in June 1838, he accepted the position of opperhoofd of the trading post of Dejima in Japan, where he succeeded Johannes Erdewin Niemann. He served until 1842 and returned to the Dutch East Indies after. He was pensioned two years later and settled as a retired colonial administrator in Banten, where he founded a tea plantation with the name Nipon.

He died in Serang, Banten on 26 April 1879.

== Personal life ==
With Johanna Carolina Wiltenaer he had one daughter that survived infancy, Louise Hermenie Cornelie Grandisson (1831–1860). A son, Johan Eduard Grandisson (1835–1836), died within ten months after his birth. On 12 May 1873, Eduard Grandisson married Augustina Martha Tjoa Nio.
