= Hendrik Godfried Duurkoop =

Dutch merchant-trader and VOC Opperhoofd in Japan

Hendrik Godfried Duurkoop (5 May 1736, Dornum – 27 July 1778, at sea) was a Dutch merchant-trader and VOC Opperhoofd in Japan. During his career with the Dutch East Indies Company (the Verenigde Oost-Indische Compagnie or VOC), he worked on Dejima, a small artificial island in the harbor of Nagasaki, Japan.

Duurkoop was born in East Frisia. In 1755 he arrived in Batavia, where his brother lived. In 1759 he was sent to the VOC trading post or "factory" at Dejima. In 1771 he was appointed bookkeeper. Duurkoop took up his duties as Opperhoofd or chief negotiant in November 1776. Early 1777 he made a hofreis to Edo.

The Japanese insisted that after one year each opperhoofd had to leave the post. During his stay in Batavia, he was infected with malaria; he died on board the ship "Huis ter Spijk" en route back to Japan in 1778. His corpse was taken to Japan and buried there on August 15. His death meant that Arend Willem Feith could not be relieved of his duties as Opperhoofd at Dejima for yet another year when Isaac Titsingh would eventually arrive in 1779.

== Notes ==
Preceded by Arend Willem Feith	VOC Opperhoofd of Dejima; 1776–1777	Succeeded by Arend Willem Feith
