= François de Haze =

François de Haze (buried in Hugli-Chinsura, October 26, 1676) worked for Dutch East India Company as an opperhoofd on Deshima (1669–1670), in Persia (1671–1673) and Bengal (1673–1676).

In 1684 his daughter Maria (died 1721) married Willem Adriaan van der Stel. Maria de Haze tried to commit suicide in 1705, by drowning herself in the fountain.

== See also ==
- VOC Opperhoofden in Japan
