= Abraham Patras =

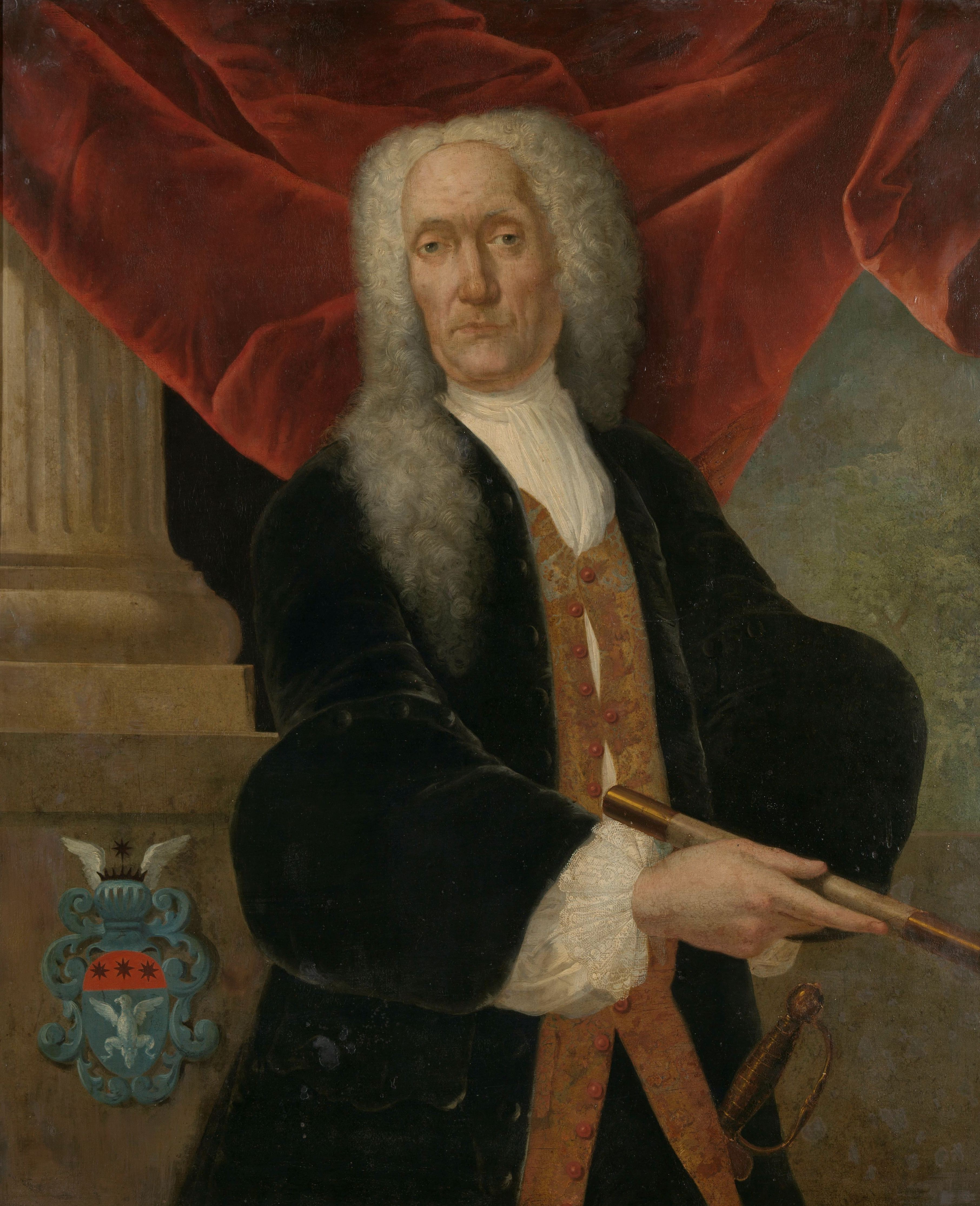
- Abraham Patras as Governor General of the Indies

Governor-General of the Dutch East Indies
- In office 11 March 1735 – 3 May 1737
- Preceded by: Dirck van Cloon
- Succeeded by: Adriaan Valckenier

Personal details
- Born: 22 May 1671 Grenoble, France
- Died: 3 May 1737 (aged 65) Batavia, Dutch East Indies

Abraham Patras (22 May 1671 – 3 May 1737) was Governor-General of the Dutch East Indies from 11 March 1735 until 3 May 1737. He was born in Grenoble of a refugee French Huguenot family. In 1685, his family fled to the Netherlands.

== Early career ==
Patras first took a job in the offices of an Amsterdam merchant named Nathaniël Gauthier (a fellow Huguenot), but he left for the Indies aboard the Hobree on 4 January 1690, where he is described as a soldier in the employ of the Enkhuizen branch of the Dutch East India Company. In 1691, he sought a change of career and got a temporary post as an agent in Batavia. In 1695 he became assistant/secretary to the Chinese estates-management administration in Ambon Island. In 1698 he was put in charge of children and matrimonial matters. He married in 1699 to a daughter of an official of the Judicial Council in Ambon. His wife died on the 16 December 1700. His only daughter also died young.

=== Rising through the ranks ===
Patras was nominated to the Council of Justice in 1700, and in 1703, he went to work as under-secretary (onderkoopman) for the Governor of the Moluccas Islands. In 1707, he became the Head (opperhoofd) of the trading post at Jambi, where his headquarters were attacked. Although severely wounded in the back, he survived. He was merchant, then Chief Factor in Palembang in 1711. In 1717, he was promoted to Chief Merchant (opperkoopman) and Office holder (gezaghebber) of the west coast of Sumatra. It was 1720, that saw him promoted to Inspector General of Accounts for the Dutch East Indies (visitateur-generaal van Nederlands-Indië). In 1721, he was sent as an envoy to Jambi. In 1722, he was appointed deputy-overseer of goods coming in and out of the castle at Batavia. In 1724, he got the very lucrative post of Head of the Dutch Bengal trading post. In 1731, he was appointed as extraordinary (i.e. co-opted) member of the Council of the Indies.

== Governor-General ==
On the 10 March 1735 on the death of Governor-General Dirck van Cloon, Patras very surprisingly was nominated Governor-General. He had never been a full member of the Council of the Indies, so this was a first, and was caused by him slipping through as a compromise candidate following a stalemate in the voting. He was not keen to take on the post in these circumstances, but agreed to do so until a better candidate could be found. On 11 March 1735 he was nominated interim Governor-General, a decision which was approved by the Directors of the East India Company.

During his short period of office, no significant decisions were made. Although he was a competent leader and had built up a great deal of practical knowledge of the territories, his age (at 64) probably ensured that he was not a very powerful Governor-General.

He died two years after his appointment during the night of 3 May 1737. He was buried in Batavia on 6 May 1737. The governor-generalship was taken over by Adriaan Valckenier.

== Anthony Patras ==
Anthony Patras (1718-1764), born in Geneva, was a nephew of governor Abraham Patras. In 1734 Anthony arrived in Batavia in the Dutch East Indies. When his uncle died the young man inherited his immense fortune, the collection of books, and art. In 1738 he married a daughter of Isaac van Schinne, an opperhoofd in Deshima and member of the Council of India. After the 1740 Batavia massacre he returned to Holland. In 1743 he tried to become a member of Sloten's vroedschap, which refused to appoint him. After two years, he suddenly became burgomaster of the Frisian town, succeeding Onno Zwier van Haren. He was a States General representative for this small city until his early death. (In Wijckel he bought Meerenstein which was built for Menno van Coehoorn.) Patras died early and probably hardly lived in his new mansion, nowadays known as Lange Voorhout Palace. His widow was forced to sell the property in 1778.

== Bibliography ==
- Paulus, J., Graaff, S. d., Stibbe, D. G., Spat, C., Stroomberg, J., & Sandbergen, F. J. W. H. (1917). Encyclopaedie van Nederlandsch-Indië. 's-Gravenhage: M. Nijhoff
- Putten, L.P. van, 2002 Ambitie en onvermogen : gouverneurs-generaal van Nederlands-Indië 1610-1796.
