= Leopold Willem Ras =

Leopold Willem Ras (1760s–1823) was a Dutch merchant-trader and diplomat.

== Life ==
Ras was the son of Joannes Henricus Ras and Magdalena Elisabeth Putkamer, who baptized children in Lillo (Antwerp), a town at the mouth of the Scheldt river. In June 1785, Ras sailed from Fort Frederik-Hendrik Berendrecht near his hometown as a ship's boy on board the Alblasserdam to work in East Asia with the Dutch East Indies Company (or Verenigde Oost-Indische Compagnie or VOC in Dutch). His father had apparently died before his departure, and until 1805 Ras sent payments home to his mother, Magdalena Elisabeth Putkamer.

Before 1798, Ras was sent to Japan as a records keeper/bookkeeper or warehouseman. At this point in Japanese history, the sole VOC outpost (or "factory") was situated on Dejima island in the harbor of Nagasaki on the southern island of Kyushu.

Ras became acting Opperhoofd or chief negotiant and officer of the VOC trading post. His role had to change after the death of Dejima's chief official, Gijsbert Hemmij. In 1798, Hemmij died at Kanegawa near Edo during the return journey to Nagasaki after a formal audience at the shogun's court in Edo.

The difficulties Ras confronted were exacerbated by a fire which destroyed the VOC warehouse and other structures on Dejima.

Ras resigned from his post on 30 June 1800. He married Christina Abigael Versteegh, with whom he had two daughters before 1815 on Banda Neira in the Moluccas. Ras died there 4 March 1823.

== See also ==
- VOC Opperhoofden in Japan
- William Robert Stewart

== Notes ==
Preceded by Gijsbert Hemmij	VOC Opperhoofden at Dejima; 8.7.1798 - 17.7.1800	Succeeded by Willem Wardenaar
