= Hendrik Caspar Romberg =

Dutch bookkeeper, merchant-trader and VOC Opperhoofd in Japan

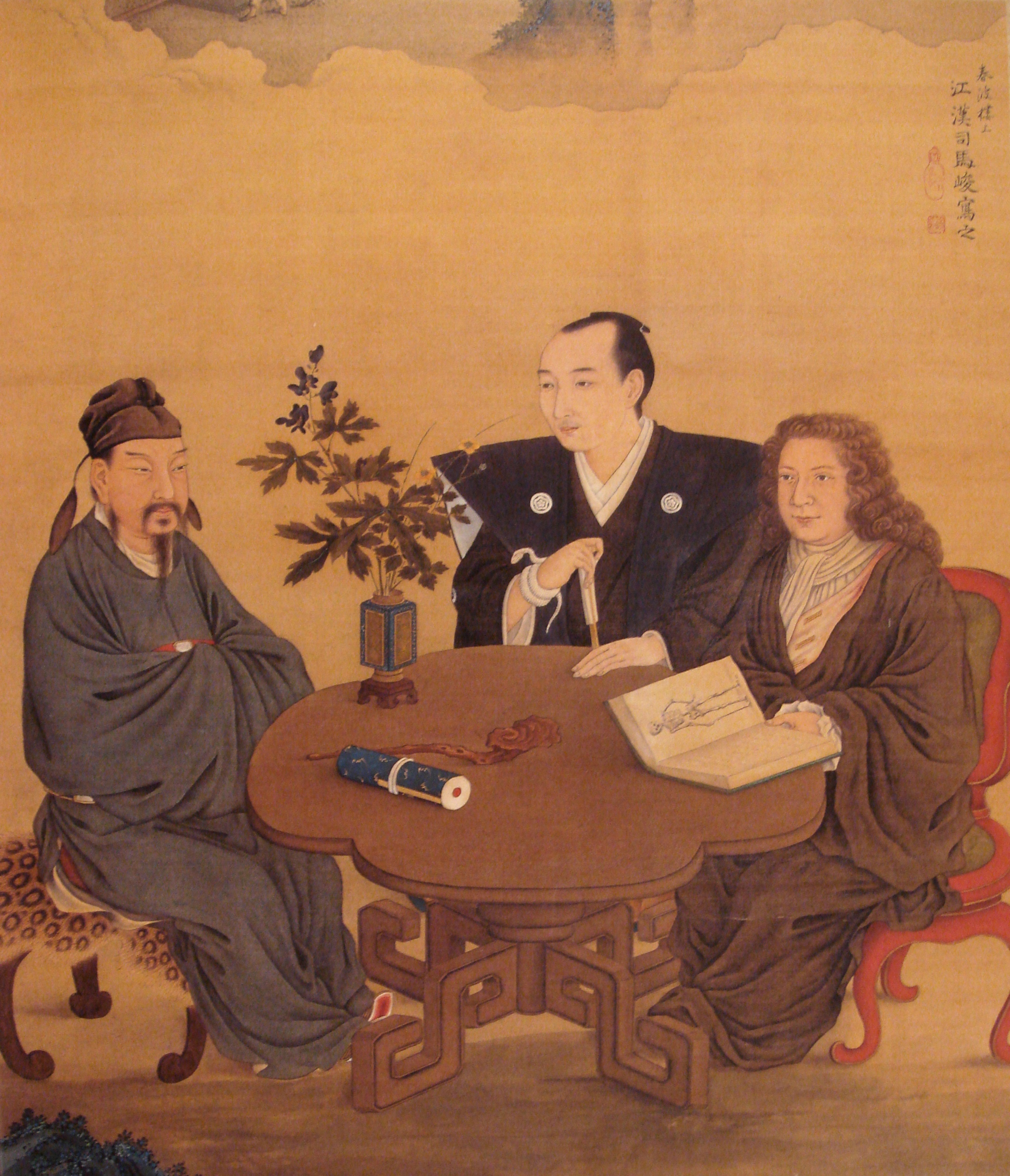
A meeting of Japan, China, and the West, by Shiba Kōkan

Hendrik Caspar Romberg (bapt. 11 October 1744 – 15 April 1793) was a Dutch bookkeeper, merchant-trader and VOC Opperhoofd in Japan.

== Life ==
Hendrik Caspar Romberg was the son of Zacharias Romberg, a bookprinter/seller on Spui in Amsterdam. Hendrik was baptized not in the opposite Lutheran church, but at home. In 1763 he traveled to Batavia in East Asia with the Dutch East Indies Company (or Vereenigde Oost-Indische Compagnie or VOC in Dutch). Ten years later he was appointed in Deshima as bookkeeper. Romberg spent more than ten years in Japan. It seems he was good-looking and had an affair with a Japanese prostitute.

He was the Opperhoofd, head of VOC trading post, during four discrete periods:

- 27 October 1782 – August 1783
- November 84 – 21 November 1785
- 21 November 1786 – 30 November 1787
- 1 August 1789 – 13 November 1790

Romberg traveled five times to Edo. On 1 May 1789, he attended a theater performance in Osaka. In April 1787 he presented the lord of Satsuma a sweet wine from Jurançon. In 1788 he met with Shiba Kōkan, interested in Western painting, and technique. Romberg's account of the Sangoku-maru is a scant record of the brief attempt by the Tokugawa shogunate to create a sea-going vessel in the 1780s. The ship sank; and the tentative project was abandoned when the political climate in Edo shifted.

In the off-years, he spent time in Batavia, which was at that time the VOC headquarters in the East Indies. The registers also listed him as chief warehouseman and paymaster.

== Notes ==
| Preceded by Isaac Titsingh | VOC Opperhoofden at Dejima; 1782–1783 | Succeeded by Isaac Titsingh |
| Preceded by Isaac Titsingh | VOC Opperhoofden at Dejima; 1784–1785 | Succeeded by Johan Parkeler |
| Preceded by Johan Parkeler | VOC Opperhoofden at Dejima; 1786–1787 | Succeeded by Johan Parkeler |
| Preceded by Johan Parkeler | VOC Opperhoofden at Dejima; 1789–1790 | Succeeded by Petrus Chassé |
