= Adriaan Valckenier =

Governor-General of the Dutch East Indies from 1737 to 1741

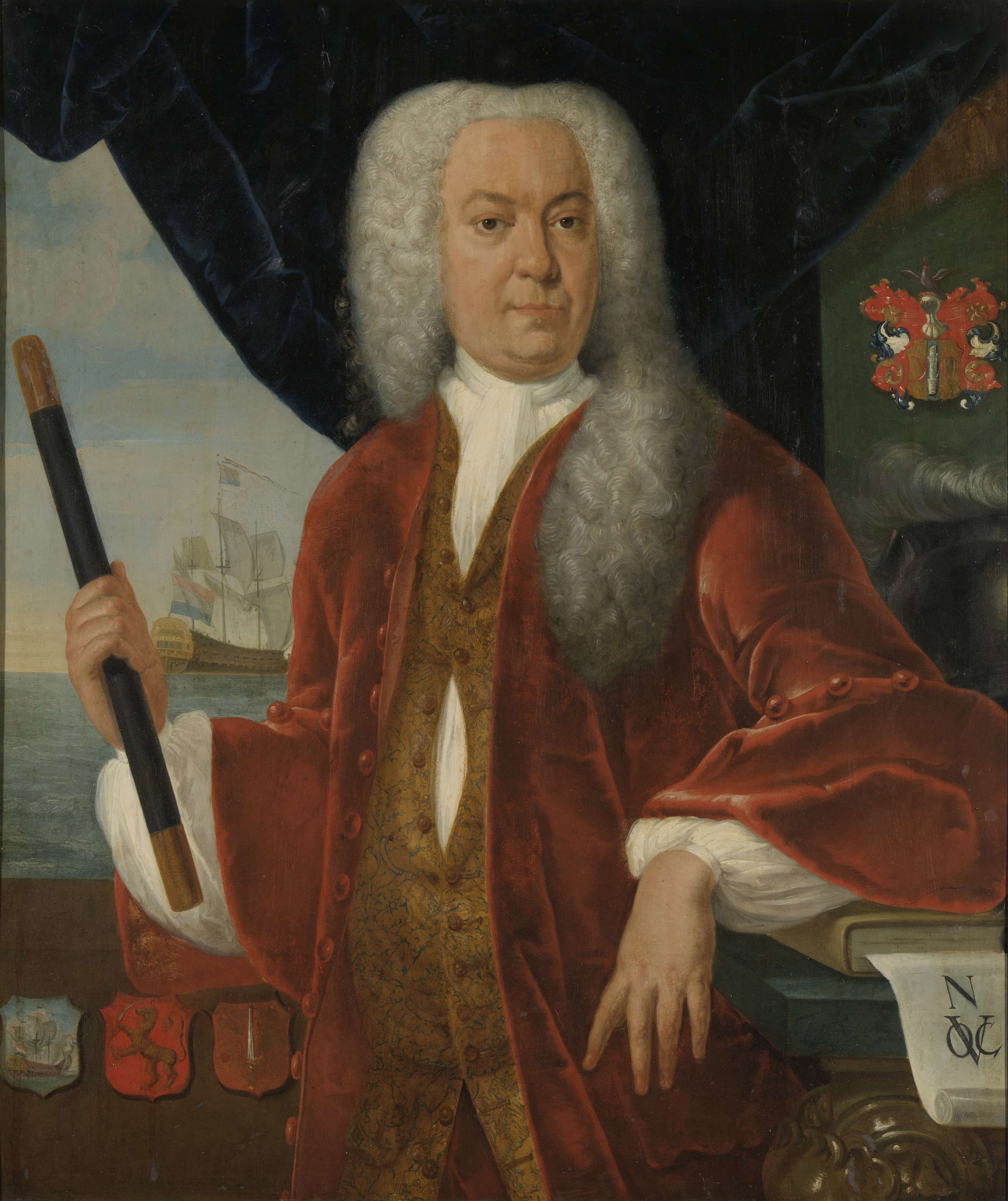
- Portrait of Adriaan Valckenier

Governor-General of the Dutch East Indies
- In office 3 May 1737 – 6 November 1741
- Preceded by: Abraham Patras
- Succeeded by: Johannes Thedens

Personal details
- Born: 6 June 1695 Amsterdam, Dutch Republic
- Died: 20 June 1751 (aged 56) Batavia Castle, Batavia, Dutch East Indies

Adriaan Valckenier (6 June 1695 – 20 June 1751) served as Governor-General of the Dutch East Indies from 1737 to 1741. He is primarily known for his role in the 1740 Batavia massacre. Valckenier was arrested for his involvement in 1742 and subsequently died in prison in Batavia (present-day Jakarta) almost a decade later.

== Biography ==
Valckenier's father held positions as an alderman and secretary in Amsterdam and was associated with the Dutch East India Company in Amsterdam. His paternal grandfather, Gillis Valckenier, was a prominent figure among the regents of Amsterdam during the later Dutch Golden Age. On 22 October 1714, Adriaan departed aboard the Linschoten to serve as an assistant buyer (onderkoopman) in the Dutch East Indies. He arrived in Batavia on 21 June 1715.

In 1726, he assumed the roles of a merchant and chief buyer (opperkoopman), and in 1727, he served as "Accountant General" (boekhouder-generaal) of the Dutch Indies. By 1730, he had been appointed to the Council of the Indies (Raad extra-ordinair), and in 1733, he attained the position of a full "Councillor". In 1736, he was promoted to "First Councillor" and "Director-General", but lost the race for the Governor General position to Abraham Patras. However, following Patras's death on 3 May 1737, Valckenier was appointed Governor General by the Council of the Indies on the same day.

== The Chinese Massacre of 1740 ==
During Adriaan Valckenier's tenure as Governor-General, Batavia witnessed the infamous event known as the Chinese Massacre. Previously, Governor-General Henricus Zwaardecroon had encouraged a significant influx of Chinese immigrants to Batavia, resulting in the Chinese population approaching 50% of the total. These immigrants were primarily engaged in various activities such as construction work within Batavia, including houses and fortifications, as well as laboring on the sugar plantations surrounding the city. Additionally, many Chinese merchants played a prominent, albeit unofficial, role in the trade with China. However, beginning in 1725, the sugar trade faced challenges, partially due to competition from Brazil, prompting a shift towards coffee production.

Rural areas experienced a rise in unemployment, leading to social unrest. This unrest extended to Batavia as job-seeking or food-seeking unemployed individuals from the countryside migrated to the city. Authorities responded by implementing residence permit requirements and designated living areas for those with permits. Tensions escalated into a significant uprising in September 1740 in the countryside. This followed Dutch proposals to relocate unemployed Chinese individuals to other Dutch colonies like Ceylon and South Africa. A rumour spread that they would all be thrown overboard en route, and in some accounts, they died when rioting on the ships, and riots in the countryside exploded.

The Dutch authorities feared collaboration between the Chinese residents of Batavia and the uprising. Between 9 and 10 October, extensive and aggressive searches were conducted in Chinese neighborhoods, resulting in the deaths of thousands, often after arrest. This violence continued for three days, followed by additional days of looting and arson, with little government intervention to halt the unrest. Estimates suggest that between 5,000 and 10,000 Chinese individuals, including men, women, and children, lost their lives during this period.

== Dismissal and death ==
Gustaaf Willem, Baron van Imhoff, a contemporary of Valckenier, expressed disapproval of the violence during the Batavia massacre. Valckenier responded by having van Imhoff arrested and sent back to the Netherlands. However, van Imhoff's perspective resonated with the Directors, who supported his stance. Valckenier faced additional criticism for his handling of the coffee trade; his decision to destroy over half of the plantations led to significant losses when demand increased and supply fell short. The Directors held him responsible for these losses and fined him 168,000 florins. Valckenier's management of the Council was also marred by internal conflicts and intrigues among its members.

Due to van Imhoff's influence in Amsterdam, Valckenier was dismissed as Governor-General in 1741 and recalled to the Netherlands. Johannes Thedens assumed his duties. Although initially cleared of wrongdoing by the Directors and even granted the rank of admiral, Valckenier was rearrested in Cape Town on 25 January 1742 while en route to the Netherlands. He was returned to the castle prison in Batavia to await trial, where he remained until his death on 20 June 1751. Despite his previous rank and position, Valckenier was buried without ceremony. Van Imhoff, his primary rival, succeeded him as Governor-General.

== Bibliography ==
- Johan Leonard Blussé (1981) Batavia 1619–1740. The Rise and Fall of a Chinese Colonial Town, University Press
- Paulus, J., Graaff, S. d., Stibbe, D. G., Spat, C., Stroomberg, J., & Sandbergen, F. J. W. H. (1917). Encyclopaedie van Nederlandsch-Indië. 's-Gravenhage: M. Nijhoff
- Putten, L.P. van, 2002 Ambitie en onvermogen : gouverneurs-generaal van Nederlands-Indië 1610–1796
- Stapel, F.W. (1941) Gouverneurs-Generaal van Nederlandsch-Indië
- De Chineezen te Batavia en de troebelen van 1740 / door Johannes Theodorus Vermeulen (1938)
