= William Robert Stewart =

American trader

William Robert Stewart was a US Captain from New York who was active in attempting trade with Japan in the beginning of the 19th century.

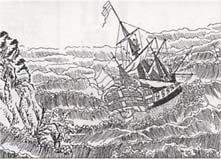
Foundering of the Eliza of New York, off Takaboku island (Nagasaki Meisho Zue).

In 1797 he was commissioned by the Dutch from Batavia to take the ship Eliza of New York to Nagasaki, Japan, with a cargo of Dutch trade goods. The ship however reportedly sank just a few hours after leaving Dejima, off the Takaboku islands. After being floated and repaired, it sailed again to Batavia, but was never heard of again.

On July 16, 1800 Stewart returned to Nagasaki, Japan on board a ship named The Emperor of Japan. It was discovered that his ship was in fact the Eliza of New York, which he had apparently stolen and renamed. He tried in vain to trade through the Dutch enclave of Dejima. The director of the Dutch enclave, Willem Wardenaar, instead sold the cargo as contraband, and used the profit to repay the original repairing and re-floating of the ship. Stewart was imprisoned and sent to Batavia, but he apparently managed to escape.

He sailed again to Japan in 1803, but again did not manage to sell his cargo.

Stewart's actions were mentioned extensively by Hendrik Doeff, the then Dutch commissioner in Dejima, in his book "Recollections of Japan".

He died in New Orleans of yellow fever in 1818.

== See also ==
- Gijsbert Hemmij
- Leopold Willem Ras
