= Hofwegen (ship) =

Hofwegen was an 18th-century Dutch fluyt. Built in 1731 in Rotterdam, the ship entered the service of the Dutch East India Company (VOC). The ship is recorded as making several voyages the Dutch colony of Batavia in Indonesia. She made the majority of these voyages at the behest of the "Rotterdam Room", a collection of merchants from Rotterdam.

On 1 September 1746, a lightning strike caused Hofwegen to explode while in the Batavian Roadstead; at the time of her destruction, she was carrying—among other goods—6 tons of silver. The combined worth of her cargo was recorded as being 600,000 guilders. Governor-General Gustaaf Willem van Imhoff managed the aftermath of the loss of the ship.
