= VOC chief traders in Japan =

Heads of the Dutch trading post in Japan

Coordinates: 32.743525°N 129.873022°E

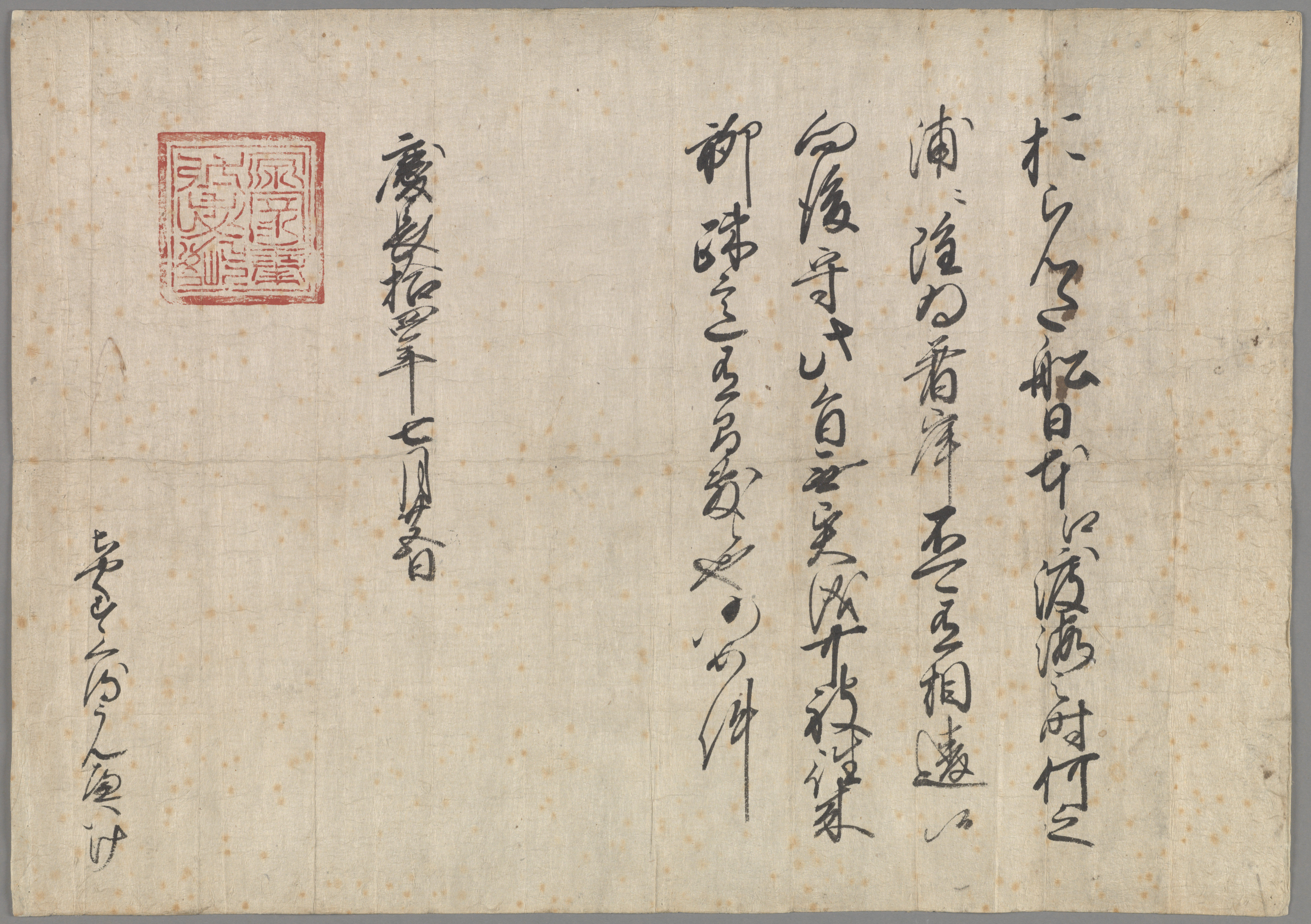
The "trade pass" (Dutch: handelspas) issued in the name of Tokugawa Ieyasu, allowing Dutch ships to travel to and dock at anywhere in Japan.

VOC chief traders in Japan were the opperhoofden of the Dutch East India Company (Dutch: Vereenigde Oostindische Compagnie; VOC) in Japan during the Edo period, when Japan was ruled by the Tokugawa shogunate.

The Dutch word opperhoofd (pl. opperhoofden, lit. 'supreme head[man]'), in its historical usage, is a gubernatorial title, comparable to the English name chief factor. It was a name for the chief executive officer of a Dutch factory, in the sense of trading post led by a factor, i.e. agent. The Japanese called the Dutch chief factors kapitan (from Portuguese capitão).

The Dutch East India Company was established in 1602 by the States-General of the Netherlands to carry out colonial activities in Asia. The VOC enjoyed unique success in Japan, in part because of the ways in which the character and other qualities of its opperhoofden were perceived to differ from other competitors.

== Trading posts ==
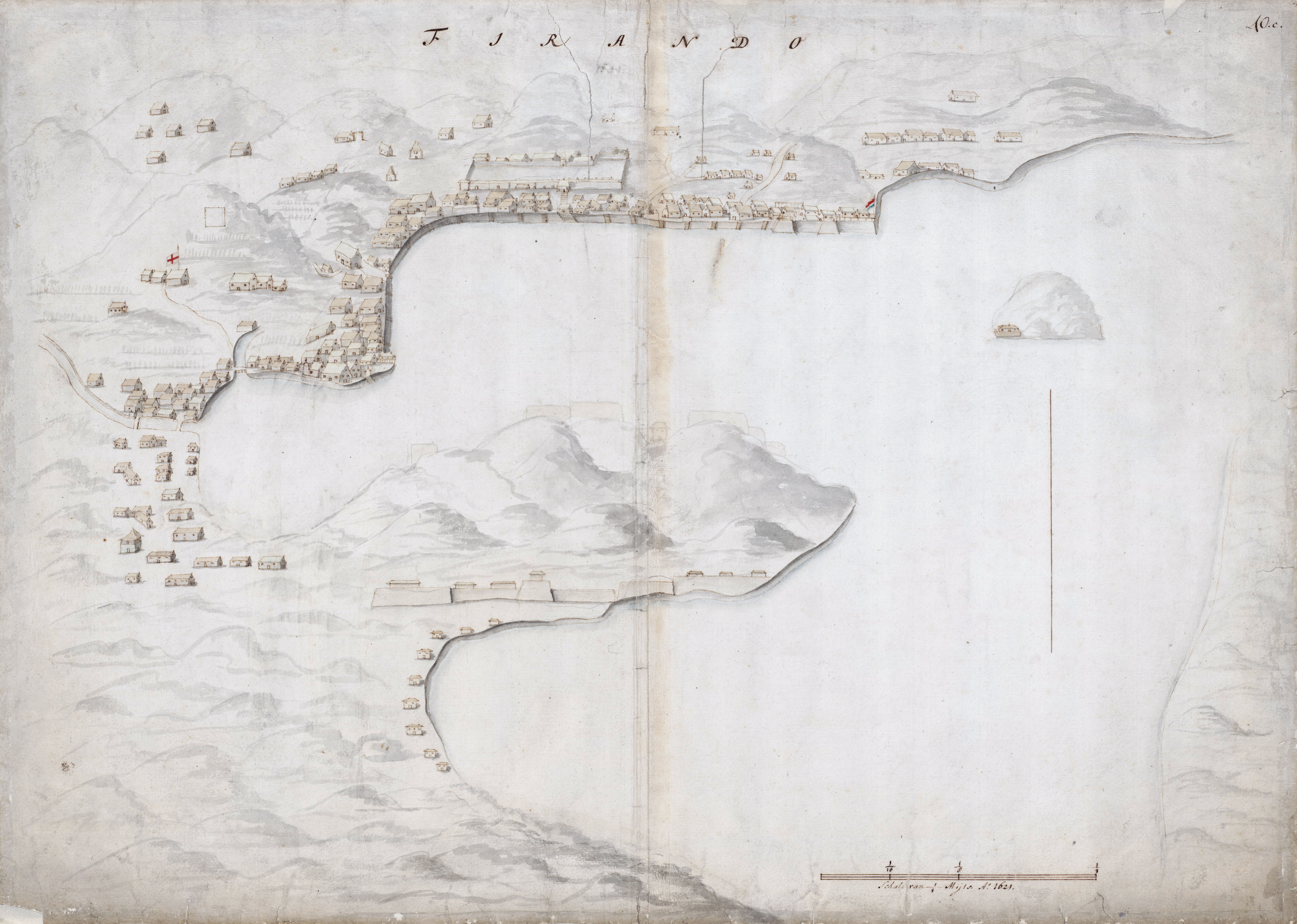
Map of the bay of Hirado in 1621. Dutch East India Company trading post (Netherlands flag) on the upper right. East India Company (British flag) on the upper left.

=== Hirado, 1609–1639 ===
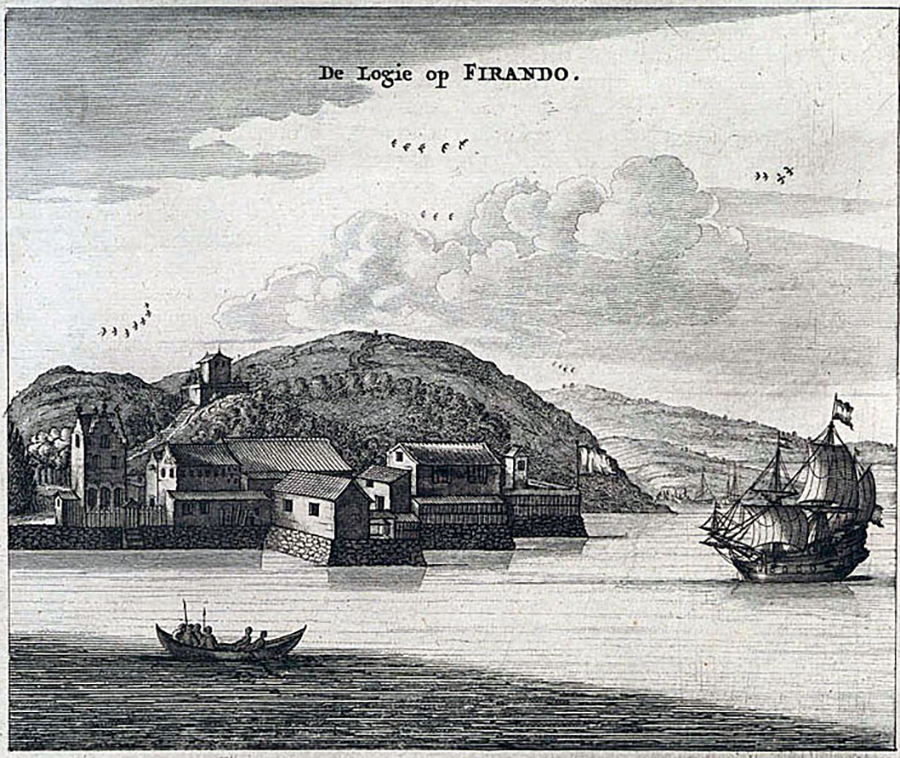
View circa 1699 of VOC compound at Hirado island, on the west coast of Kyūshū

The first VOC trading outpost in Japan was on the island of Hirado off the coast of Kyūshū. Permission for establishing this permanent facility was granted in 1609 by the first Tokugawa-shōgun Ieyasu; but the right to make use of this convenient location was revoked in 1639.

=== Dejima, 1639–1860 ===
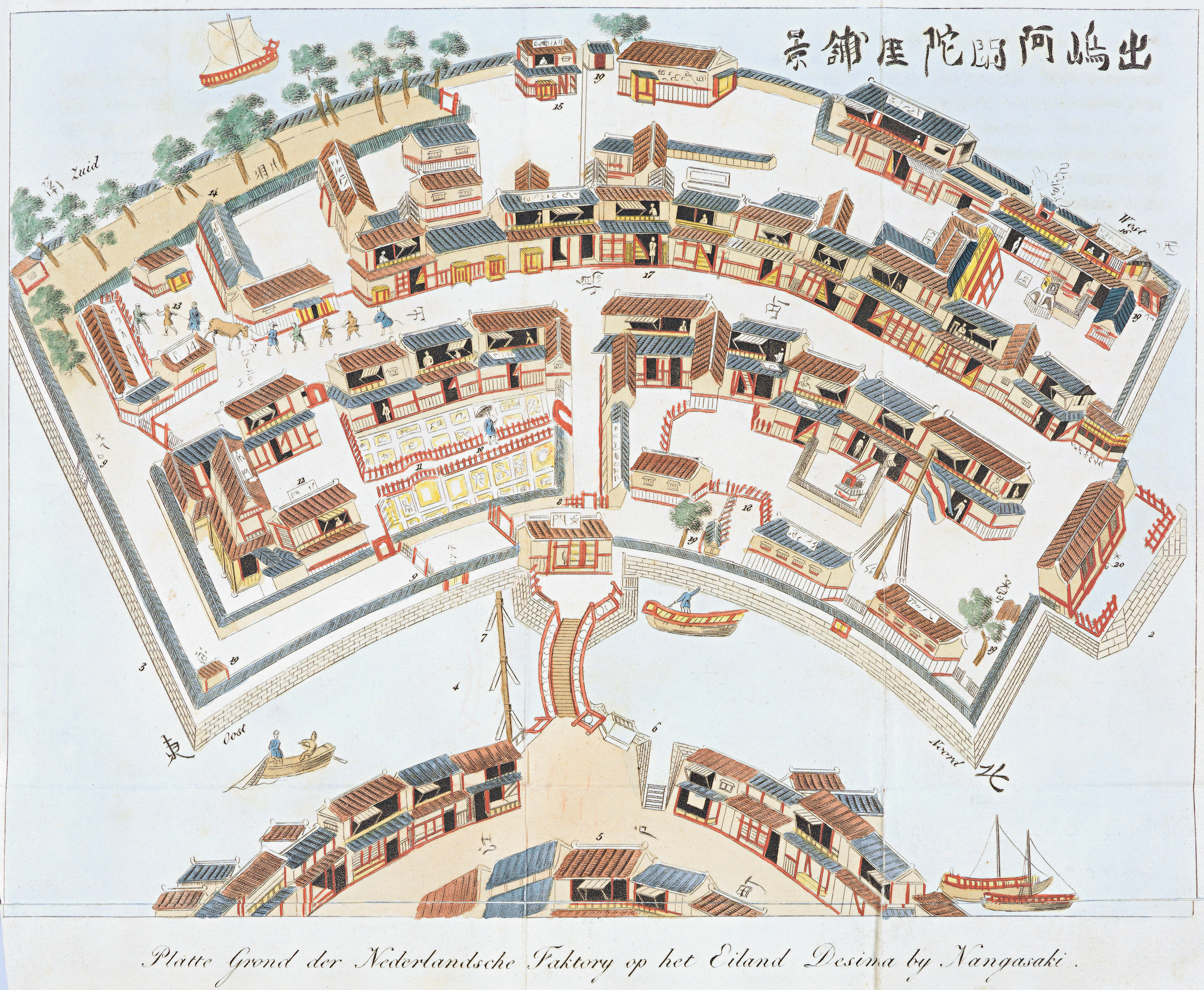
An imagined bird's-eye view of Dejima's layout and structures. Note the island's fan-shape. Japanese wood-block print made in 1780.

In 1638, the harsh sakoku ("closed door" policy) was ordered by the Tokugawa shogunate; and by 1641, the VOC had to transfer all of its mercantile operations to the small man-made island of Dejima in Nagasaki harbor. The island had been built to segregate the Dutch, from the rest of Japan, on the account that trade remained highly scrutinized by local authorities and the walls heavily guarded. There was no contact between the Japanese and Dutch merchants, with only 19 people being able to disembark on Dejima.

The Dutch presence in Japan was closely monitored and controlled. For example, each year the VOC had to transfer the opperhoofd. Each opperhoofd was expected to travel to Edo to offer tribute to the shogun (Dutch missions to Edo). The VOC traders had to be careful not to import anything religious; and they were not allowed to bring any women, nor to bury their dead ashore. They were largely free to do as they pleased on the island; but they were explicitly ordered to work on Sunday.

For nearly 200 years a series of VOC traders lived, worked and seemed to thrive in this confined location.

In 1799 the VOC went bankrupt. The trade with Japan was continued by the Dutch at Batavia, with an interruption during the British occupation of Java, during which Stamford Raffles unsuccessfully tried to capture Dejima. After the creation of the Kingdom of the Netherlands (1815) the trade with Japan came under the administration of the minister of the colonies by way of the governor general in Batavia. The directors of the trade (opperhoofd) became colonial civil servants. From 1855 the director of the trade with Japan, Janus Henricus Donker Curtius, became "Dutch Commissioner in Japan" with orders to conclude a treaty with Japan. He succeeded in 1855 to conclude a convention, changed into a treaty in January 1856. In 1857 he concluded a commercial paragraph in addition to the treaty of 1856, thus concluding the first western treaty of friendship and commerce with Japan. His successor, Jan Karel de Wit, was Dutch Consul General in Japan, though still a colonial civil servant. In 1862 the Dutch representation in Japan was transferred to the Ministry for Foreign Affairs. This change was effected in Japan in 1863, Dirk de Graeff van Polsbroek becoming Consul General and Political Agent in Japan.

== List of chief traders at Hirado ==
Hirado is a small island just off the western shore of the Japanese island of Kyūshū. In the early 17th century, Hirado was a major center of foreign trade and included British, Chinese, and other trading stations along with the Dutch one, maintained and operated by the Dutch East India Company (VOC) after 1609. The serial leaders of this VOC trading enclave or factory at Hirado were:

Hirado chief traders
Name	Start	End	Ref.
Jacques Specx	20 September 1609	28 August 1612	—N/a
Hendrick Brouwer	28 August 1612	6 August 1614	—N/a
Jacques Specx	6 August 1614	29 October 1621	—N/a
Leonardt Camps	29 October 1621	21 November 1623	—N/a
Cornelis van Nijenrode	21 November 1623	1631	—N/a
Pieter Stamper	1631	1631	—N/a
Cornelis van Nijenrode	1631	31 January 1633	—N/a
Pieter van Sante	31 January 1633	6 September 1633	—N/a
Nicolaes Couckebacker	6 September 1633	1635	
Maerten Wesselingh (or Hendrick Hagenaer)	1635	1637	—N/a
Nicolaes Couckebacker	1637	3 February 1639	
François Caron	3 February 1639	13 February 1641	

== List of chief traders at Dejima ==
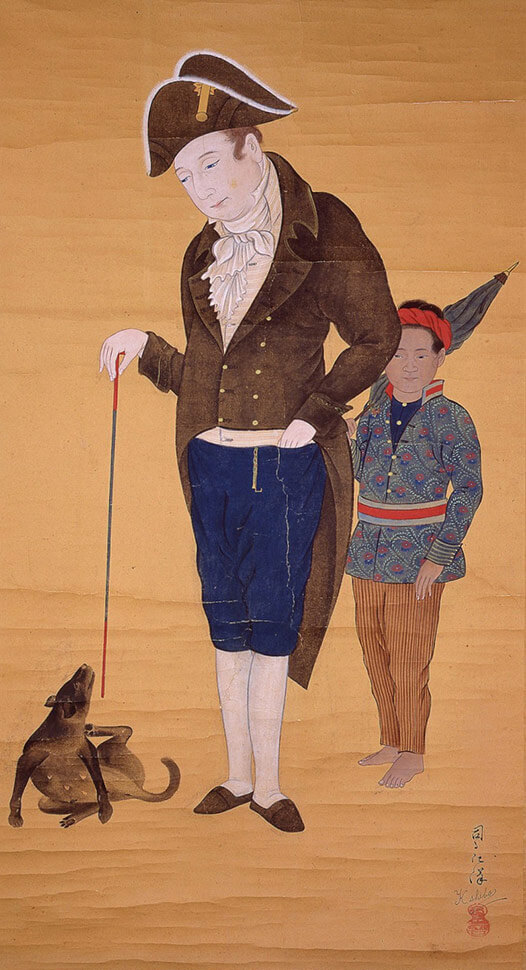
Japanese painting of Hendrik Doeff and a slave in Dejima

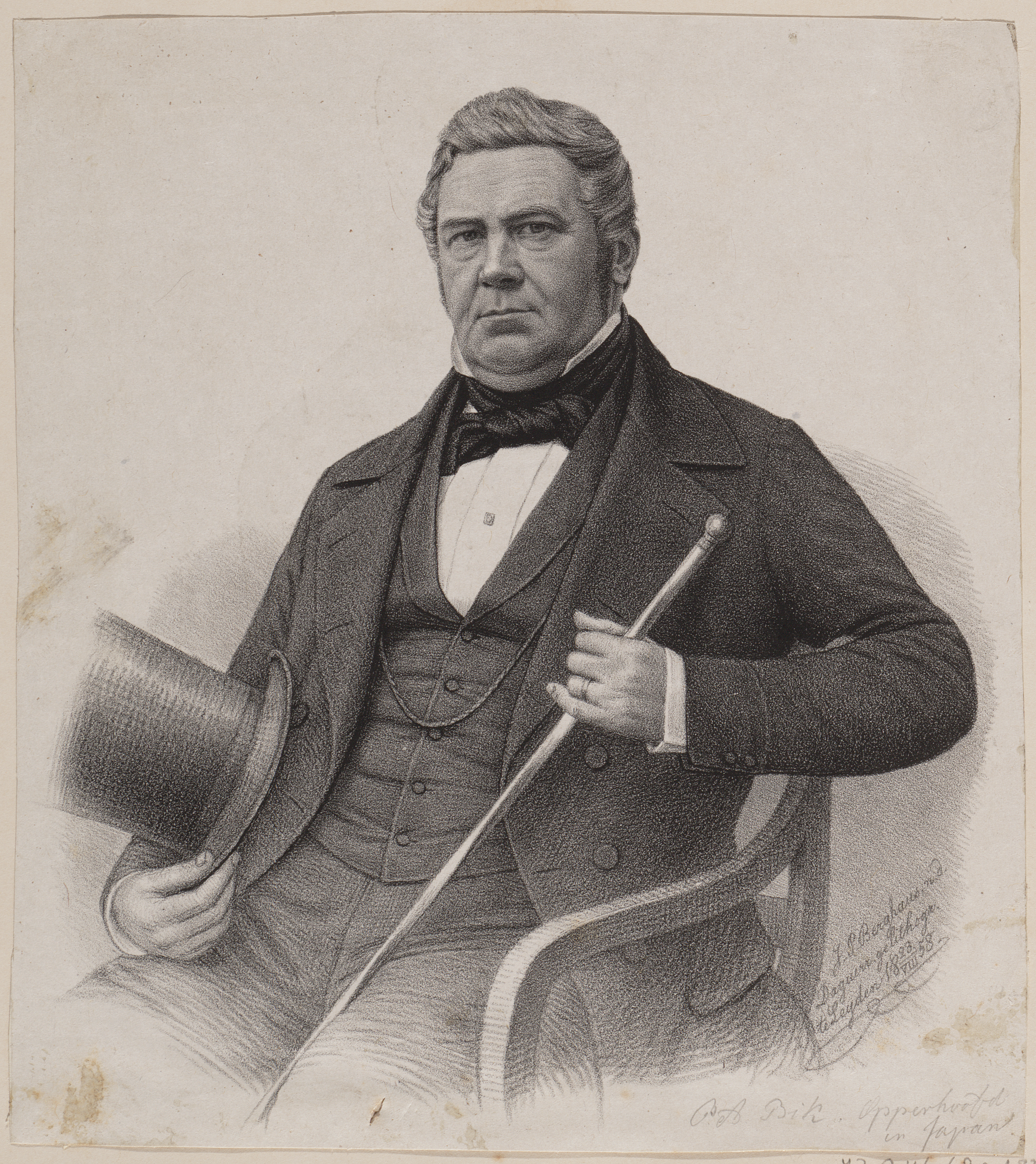
Pieter Albert Bik, main Dutch chief in Japan, 1842–1845, by Johann Peter Berghaus

Dejima (出島) was a fan-shaped artificial island in the bay of Nagasaki. This island was a Dutch trading post during Japan's period of maritime restrictions (海禁, kaikin; 1641–1853) during the Edo period. The serial leaders of this VOC trading factory at Dejima were:

Dejima chief traders
Name	Start	End	Ref.
Maximiliaen Le Maire	14 February 1641	30 October 1641	
Jan van Elseracq	1 November 1641	29 October 1642	
Pieter Anthoniszoon Overtwater	29 October 1642	1 August 1643	
Jan van Elseracq	1 August 1643	24 November 1644	
Pieter Anthonijszoon Overtwater	24 November 1644	30 November 1645	
Renier van Tzum	30 November 1645	27 October 1646	
Willem Verstegen [Versteijen]	28 October 1646	10 October 1647	
Frederick Coyett	3 November 1647	9 December 1648	
Dircq Snoecq	9 December 1648	5 November 1649	
Anthony van Brouckhorst	5 November 1649	25 October 1650	—N/a
Pieter Sterthemius	25 October 1650	3 November 1651	—N/a
Adriaen van der Burgh	1 November 1651	3 November 1652	—N/a
Frederick Coyett	4 November 1652	10 November 1653	—N/a
Gabriel Happart	4 November 1653	31 October 1654	—N/a
Leonard Winninx	31 October 1654	23 October 1655	—N/a
Joan Boucheljon	23 October 1655	1 November 1656	—N/a
Zacharias Wagenaer [Wagener]	1 November 1656	27 October 1657	—N/a
Johannes Bouchelion	27 October 1657	23 October 1658	—N/a
Zacharias Wagenaer [Wagener]	22 October 1658	4 November 1659	—N/a
Johannes Bouchelion	4 November 1659	26 October 1660	—N/a
Hendrick Indijck	26 October 1660	21 November 1661	—N/a
Dirck van Lier	11 November 1661	6 November 1662	—N/a
Hendrick Indijck	6 November 1662	20 October 1663	—N/a
Willem Volger	20 October 1663	7 November 1664	—N/a
Jacob Gruijs	7 November 1664	27 October 1665	—N/a
Willem Volger	28 October 1665	27 October 1666	—N/a
Daniel Six	18 October 1666	6 November 1667	—N/a
Constantin Ranst de Jonge	6 November 1667	25 October 1668	—N/a
Daniel Six [Sicx]	25 October 1668	14 October 1669	—N/a
François de Haze	14 October 1669	2 November 1670	—N/a
Martinus Caesar	2 November 1670	12 November 1671	—N/a
Johannes Camphuys	22 October 1671	12 November 1672	
Martinus Caesar	13 November 1672	29 October 1673	—N/a
Johannes Camphuys	29 October 1673	19 October 1674	
Martinus Caesar	20 October 1674	7 November 1675	—N/a
Johannes Camphuys	7 November 1675	27 October 1676	
Dirck de Haze	27 October 1676	16 October 1677	—N/a
Albert Breevinck	16 October 1677	4 November 1678	—N/a
Dirck de Haas	4 November 1678	24 October 1679	—N/a
Albert Breevinck	24 October 1679	11 November 1680	—N/a
Isaac van Schinne	11 November 1680	31 October 1681	—N/a
Hendrick Canzius	31 October 1681	20 October 1682	—N/a
Andreas Cleyer	20 October 1682	8 November 1683	
Constantin Ranst de Jonge	8 November 1683	28 October 1684	—N/a
Hendrick van Buijtenhem	25 October 1684	7 October 1685	
Andreas Cleyer	17 October 1685	5 November 1686	
Constantin Ranst de Jonge	5 November 1686	25 October 1687	—N/a
Hendrick van Buijtenhem	25 October 1687	13 October 1688	
Cornelis van Outhoorn	13 October 1688	1 November 1689	—N/a
Balthasar Sweers	1 November 1689	21 October 1690	—N/a
Hendrick van Buijtenhem	21 October 1690	9 November 1691	
Cornelis van Outhoorn	9 November 1691	29 October 1692	—N/a
Hendrick van Buijtenhem	29 October 1692	19 October 1693	
Gerrit de Heere	19 October 1693	7 November 1694	—N/a
Hendrik Dijkman	7 November 1694	27 October 1695	—N/a
Cornelis van Outhoorn	27 October 1695	15 October 1696	—N/a
Hendrik Dijkman	15 October 1696	3 November 1697	—N/a
Pieter de Vos	3 November 1697	23 October 1698	—N/a
Hendrik Dijkman	23 October 1698	12 October 1699	—N/a
Pieter de Vos	21 October 1699	31 October 1700	—N/a
Hendrik Dijkman	31 October 1700	21 October 1701	—N/a
Abraham Douglas	21 October 1701	30 October 1702	—N/a
Ferdinand de Groot	9 November 1702	30 October 1703	—N/a
Gideon Tant	30 October 1703	18 October 1704	—N/a
Ferdinand de Groot	18 October 1704	6 November 1705	—N/a
Ferdinand de Groot	26 October 1706	15 October 1707	—N/a
Hermanus Menssingh	15 October 1707	2 November 1708	—N/a
Jasper van Mansdale	2 November 1708	22 October 1709	—N/a
Hermanus Menssingh	22 October 1709	10 November 1710	—N/a
Nicolaas Joan van Hoorn	10 November 1710	31 October 1711	—N/a
Cornelis Lardijn	31 October 1711	7 November 1713	—N/a
Cornelis Lardijn	7 November 1713	27 October 1714	—N/a
Nicolaas Joan van Hoorn	27 October 1714	19 October 1715	—N/a
Gideon Boudaen	19 October 1715	3 November 1716	—N/a
Joan Aouwer	3 November 1716	24 October 1717	—N/a
Christiaen van Vrijbergh[e]	24 October 1717	13 October 1718	—N/a
Joan Aouwer	13 October 1718	21 October 1720	—N/a
Roeloff Diodati	21 October 1720	9 November 1721	—N/a
Hendrik Durven	9 November 1721	18 October 1723	—N/a
Johannes Thedens	18 October 1723	25 October 1725	—N/a
Joan de Hartogh	25 October 1725	15 October 1726	—N/a
Pieter Boockestijn	15 October 1726	3 November 1727	—N/a
Abraham Minnedonk	3 November 1727	20 October 1728	—N/a
Pieter Boockestijn	22 October 1728	12 October 1729	—N/a
Abraham Minnedonk	12 October 1729	31 October 1730	—N/a
Pieter Boockestijn	31 October 1730	7 November 1732	—N/a
Hendrik van de Bel	7 November 1732	27 October 1733	—N/a
Rogier de Laver	27 October 1733	16 October 1734	—N/a
David Drinckman	16 October 1734	4 November 1735	—N/a
Bernardus Coop [Coopa] à Groen	4 November 1735	24 October 1736	—N/a
Jan van der Cruijsse	24 October 1736	13 October 1737	—N/a
Gerardus Bernardus Visscher	13 October 1737	21 October 1739	—N/a
Thomas van Rhee	22 October 1739	8 November 1740	—N/a
Jacob van der Waeijen	9 November 1740	28 October 1741	—N/a
Thomas van Rhee	29 October 1741	17 October 1742	—N/a
Jacob van der Waeijen	17 October 1742	9 November 1743	—N/a
David Brouwer	5 November 1743	1 November 1744	—N/a
Jacob van der Waeijen	2 November 1744	28 December 1745	—N/a
Jan Louis de Win	30 December 1745	2 November 1746	—N/a
Jacob Baelde	3 November 1746	25 October 1747	—N/a
Jan Louis de Win	28 October 1747	11 November 1748	—N/a
Jacob Baelde	12 November 1748	8 December 1749	—N/a
Hendrik van Homoed	8 December 1749	24 December 1750	—N/a
Abraham van Suchtelen	25 December 1750	18 November 1751	—N/a
Hendrik van Homoed	19 November 1751	5 December 1752	—N/a
David Boelen	6 December 1752	15 October 1753	—N/a
Hendrik van Homoed	16 October 1753	3 November 1754	—N/a
David Boelen	4 November 1754	25 October 1755	—N/a
Herbert Vermeulen	25 October 1755	12 October 1756	—N/a
David Boelen	13 October 1756	31 October 1757	—N/a
Herbert Vermeulen	1 November 1757	11 November 1758	—N/a
Johannes Reijnouts	12 November 1758	11 November 1760	—N/a
Marten Huijshoorn	12 November 1760	30 October 1761	—N/a
Johannes Reijnouts	31 October 1761	2 December 1762	—N/a
Fredrik Willem Wineke	3 December 1762	6 November 1763	—N/a
Jan Crans	7 November 1763	24 October 1764	—N/a
Fredrik Willem Wineke	25 October 1764	7 November 1765	—N/a
Jan Crans	8 November 1765	31 October 1766	—N/a
Herman Christiaan Kastens	1 November 1766	20 October 1767	—N/a
Jan Crans	21 October 1767	8 November 1769	—N/a
Olphert Elias	9 November 1769	16 November 1770	—N/a
Daniel Armenault	17 November 1770	9 November 1771	—N/a
Arend Willem Feith	10 November 1771	3 November 1772	—N/a
Daniel Armenault [Almenaault]	4 November 1772	22 November 1773	—N/a
Arend Willem Feith	23 November 1773	10 November 1774	—N/a
Daniel Armenault [Almenaault]	11 November 1774	28 October 1775	—N/a
Arend Willem Feith	28 October 1775	22 November 1776	—N/a
Hendrik Godfried Duurkoop	23 November 1776	11 November 1777	—N/a
Arend Willem Feith	12 November 1777	28 November 1779	—N/a
Isaac Titsingh	29 November 1779	5 November 1780	—N/a
Arend Willem Feith	6 November 1780	23 November 1781	—N/a
Isaac Titsingh	24 November 1781	26 October 1783	—N/a
Hendrik Caspar Romberg	27 October 1783	August 1784	—N/a
Isaac Titsingh	August 1784	30 November 1784	—N/a
Hendrik Caspar Romberg	30 November 1784	21 November 1785	—N/a
Johan Fredrik van Rheede tot de Parkeler	22 November 1785	20 November 1786	—N/a
Hendrik Caspar Romberg	21 November 1786	30 November 1787	—N/a
Johan Frederik van Rheede tot de Parkeler	1 December 1787	1 August 1789	—N/a
Hendrik Casper Romberg	1 August 1789	13 November 1790	—N/a
Petrus Theodorus Chassé	13 November 1790	13 November 1792	—N/a
Gijsbert Hemmij	13 November 1792	8 July 1798	—N/a
Leopold Willem Ras	8 July 1798	17 July 1800	—N/a
Willem Wardenaar	16 July 1800	14 November 1803	—N/a
Hendrik Doeff	14 November 1803	6 December 1817	—N/a
Jan Cock Blomhoff	6 December 1817	20 November 1823	—N/a
Johan Willem de Stürler	20 November 1823	5 August 1826	—N/a
Germain Felix Meijlan	4 August 1826	1 November 1830	—N/a
Jan Willem Frederik van Citters	1 November 1830	30 November 1834	—N/a
Johannes Erdewin Niemann	1 December 1834	17 November 1838	—N/a
Eduard Grandisson	18 November 1838	November 1842	—N/a
Pieter Albert Bik	November 1842	31 October 1845	—N/a
Joseph Henrij Levijssohn	1 November 1845	31 October 1850	—N/a
Frederik Cornelis Rose	1 November 1850	31 October 1852	—N/a
Janus Henricus Donker Curtius	2 November 1852	28 February 1860	—N/a

== See also ==
- Rangaku – Dutch studies
- The Thousand Autumns of Jacob de Zoet

== Sources ==
- Blomhoff, J.C. (2000). The Court Journey to the Shogun of Japan: From a Private Account by Jan Cock Blomhoff. Amsterdam.
- Blussé, L. et al., eds. (1995–2001) The Deshima [sic] Dagregisters: Their Original Tables of Content. Leiden.
- Blussé, L. et al., eds. (2004). The Deshima Diaries Marginalia 1740–1800. Tokyo.
- Boxer. C.R. (1950). Jan Compagnie in Japan, 1600–1850: An Essay on the Cultural, Artistic, and Scientific Influence Exercised by the Hollanders in Japan from the Seventeenth to the Nineteenth Centuries. Den Haag.
- Caron, F. (1671). A True Description of the Mighty Kingdoms of Japan and Siam. London.
- Clulow, A. (2014). The Company and the Shogun: The Dutch Encounters with Tokugawa Japan. New York.
- (in Dutch) de Winter, Michiel. (2006). "VOC in Japan: Betrekkingen tussen Hollanders en Japanners in de Edo-periode, tussen 1602–1795" ("VOC in Japan: Relations between the Dutch and Japanese in the Edo-period, between 1602–1795").
- Doeff, H. (1633). Herinneringen uit Japan. Amsterdam. [Doeff, H. "Recollections of Japan" ISBN 1-55395-849-7]
- Edo-Tokyo Museum exhibition catalog. (2000). A Very Unique Collection of Historical Significance: The Kapitan (the Dutch Chief) Collection from the Edo Period—The Dutch Fascination with Japan. Catalog of "400th Anniversary Exhibition Regarding Relations between Japan and the Netherlands," a joint project of the Edo-Tokyo Museum, the City of Nagasaki, the National Museum of Ethnology, the National Natuurhistorisch Museum" and the National Herbarium of the Netherlands in Leiden, the Netherlands. Tokyo.
- Leguin, F. (2002). Isaac Titsingh (1745–1812): Een passie voor Japan, leven en werk van de grondlegger van de Europese Japanologie. Leiden.
- Nederland's Patriciaat, Vol. 13 (1923). Den Haag.
- Screech, Timon. (2006). Secret Memoirs of the Shoguns: Isaac Titsingh and Japan, 1779–1822. London.
- Siebold, P.F.B. v. (1897). Nippon. Würzburg e Leipzig.
- Titsingh, I. (1820). Mémoires et Anecdotes sur la Dynastie régnante des Djogouns, Souverains du Japon. Paris.
- Titsingh, I. (1822). Illustrations of Japan; consisting of Private Memoirs and Anecdotes of the reigning dynasty of The Djogouns, or Sovereigns of Japan. London.
