= Gustaaf Willem van Imhoff =

Dutch colonial administrator (1705–1750)

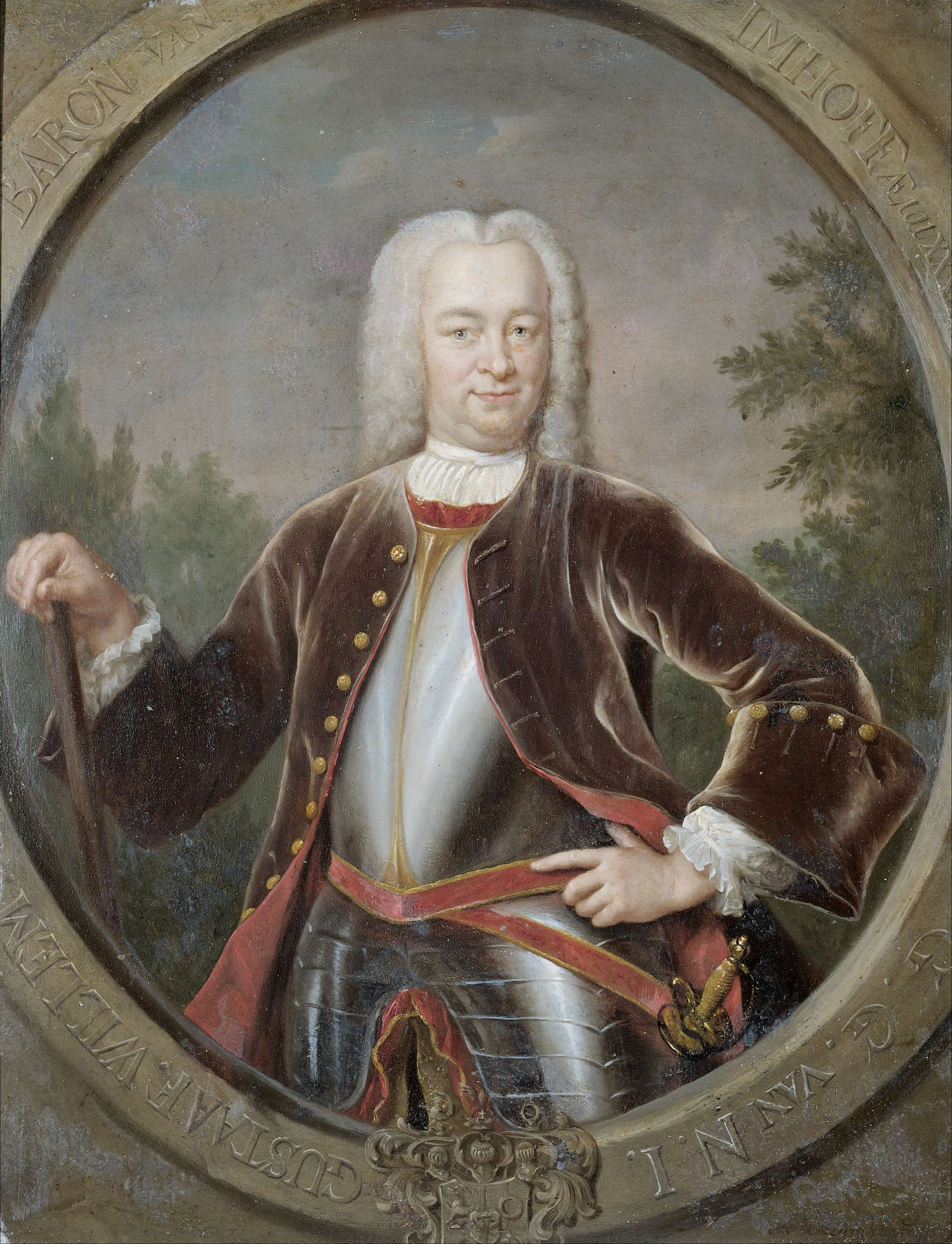

Governor of Dutch Ceylon
- In office 23 July 1736 – 12 March 1740
- Preceded by: Jan Maccare (acting)
- Succeeded by: Willem Maurits Bruyninck

Governor-General of the Dutch East Indies
- In office 28 May 1743 – 1 November 1750
- Preceded by: Johannes Thedens
- Succeeded by: Jacob Mossel

Personal details
- Born: 8 August 1705 Leer, East Frisia
- Died: 1 November 1750 (aged 45) Batavia, Dutch East Indies (present-day Indonesia)

Gustaaf Willem, Baron van Imhoff (8 August 1705 – 1 November 1750) was a Dutch colonial administrator for the Dutch East India Company (VOC). He served as Governor of Ceylon from 1736 to 1740 and as Governor-General of the Dutch East Indies from 1743 until his death in 1750 at Istana Cipanas.

== Early years ==
Gustaff van Imhoff was born into the East Frisian branch of the Imhoff family from Nuremberg. His father, Wilhelm Heinrich Freiherr von Imhoff came from the town of Leer in northwestern Germany, a few kilometers from the Dutch border.

In 1725, van Imhoff entered into the service of the Dutch East India Company in Batavia (modern-day Jakarta), then colonial capital of the Dutch East Indies. Van Imhoff was promoted several times within the company before being appointed colonial governor in Ceylon (Modern-day Sri Lanka) on 23 July 1736.

== Ceylon ==
Van Imhoff's tenure as governor of Ceylon put an end to the chaos that had pervaded the previous administration. He established constructive relations with Vira Narendra Sinha, King of Kandy.

King Narendra was married to a Tamil princess of Madurai (Tamil Nadu, India), and the princess's brother-in-law, Sri Vijaya Rajasinha who succeeded him after Narendra's death on 24 May 1739, was seen to be more of a Tamil than Sinhalese (the majority ethnic group in Ceylon). Van Imhoff was concerned about this royal succession as closer contacts between the Tamils of Ceylon (under King Sri Vijaya Rajasinha) and the Tamils of south India was seen as a threat to the Dutch East India Company's commercial monopoly.

In his letters, van Imhoff expressed his surprise that the Sinhalese people had accepted such a king, considering their haughty attitude towards the Tamils of India. However, van Imhoff saw an interesting opportunity in this turn of events and proposed to the Lords Seventeen (Heeren XVII, the directors of the VOC) that the Kingdom of Ceylon be divided in two. They rejected the proposition as war was deemed as too costly.

Despite the profitable production of spices, the colony was always in a state of deficit because its profits were allotted to the VOC in general, not to the colony itself. This practice prevented the Governors from becoming too extravagant in their habits, as was the case in other colonies.

== Travancore–Dutch War ==
In January 1739, Imhoff travelled to the port of Cochin on the south west coast of India with a view to authoring a report on the state of Dutch Malabar for the VOC's governors in Batavia. He found that the expansionist aims of Maharajah Marthanda Varma of Travancore threatened the VOC's power in the region and decided to use force to ensure that the local Malabar rulers fulfilled their trade contracts with the VOC. Imhoff demanded that Marthanda Varma restore the annexed kingdom of Kayamkulam to its former ruling princess, threatening to invade Travancore should the Maharajah refuse. Marthanda Varma countered that he would overcome any Dutch forces that were sent to his kingdom, going on to say that he was considering an invasion of Europe.

The situation on the Malabar Coast triggered the Travancore–Dutch War, a conflict unauthorised by the Dutch government in Batavia. At the subsequent 1741 Battle of Colachel, the Dutch were routed, triggering a series of events that eventually led to the Treaty of Mavelikkara in 1753, under which both parties agreed to live in peace.

== Batavia ==
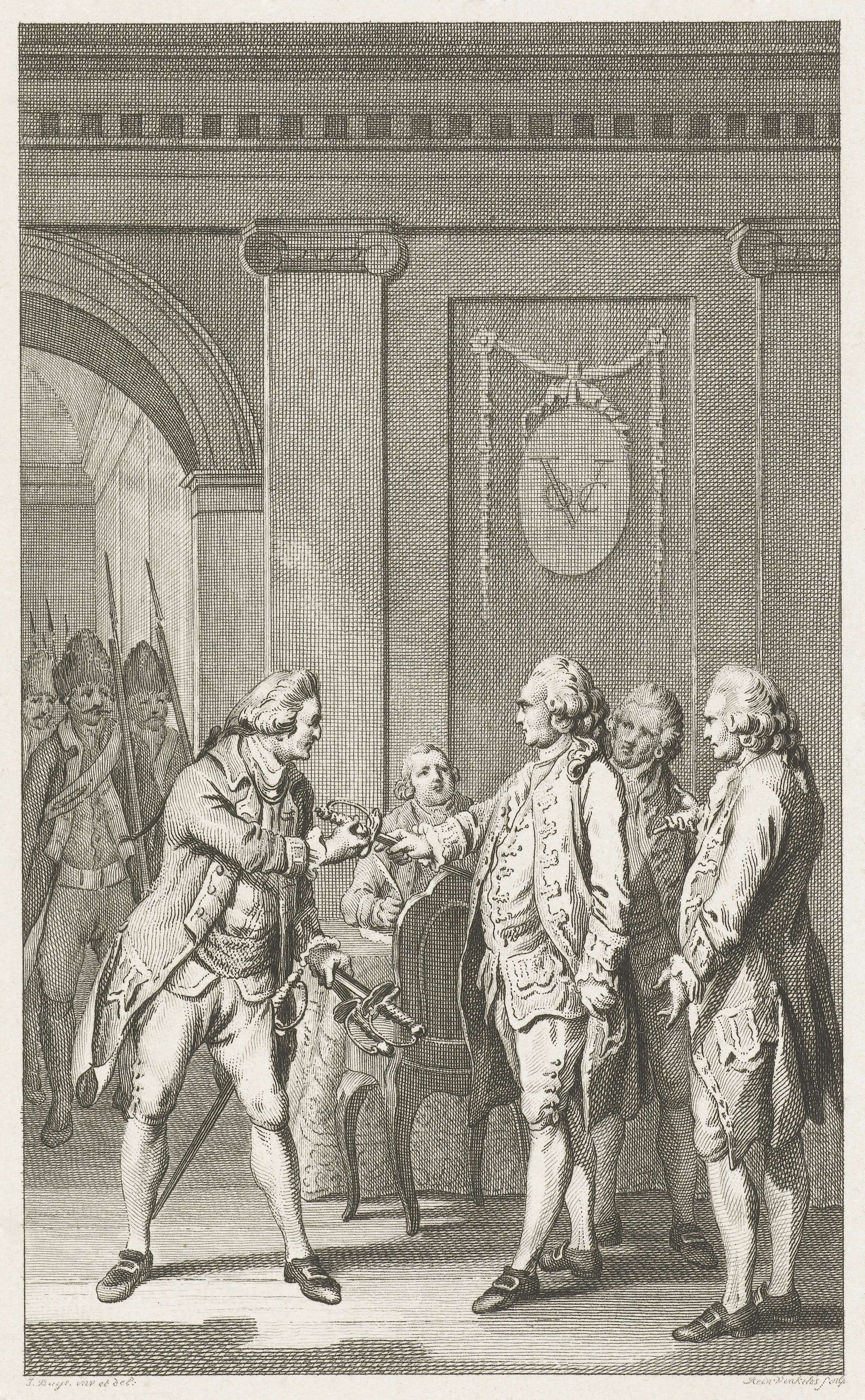
The arrest of Gustaff van Imhoff

On 12 March 1740, Willem Maurits Bruyninck replaced Imhoff as governor of Ceylon and Imhoff returned to Batavia, which he found in a precarious situation. Former Governor-General Adriaan Valckenier believed that the Chinese population in the area around Batavia had grown too large. His plan to relocate the unemployed population to Ceylon and the Cape Colony in South Africa failed when a rumour alleging that the Dutch were planning to throw Chinese people overboard on the high seas led to an insurrection against the VOC in which 50 Dutch soldiers were killed. Valckenier had then responded with a counter-attack on 9 October 1740 that was meant to put insurgents under control. This quickly got out of hand, and – despite an amnesty proclaimed on 11 October – led to the 1740 Batavia massacre which went on for several days and which killed anywhere between 5,000 and 10,000 mostly Chinese inhabitants.

Van Imhoff voiced opposition to this brutal policy, which led to his arrest and deportation back to the Dutch Republic. However, upon his arrival, the Lords Seventeen decided to name him Governor-general of the Dutch East Indies and sent him back to Batavia.

En route to Batavia, Imhoff visited the Dutch colony in Cape Town, in the Cape Colony, where he discovered that Dutch settlers were penetrating increasingly further into the interior, and were losing contact with the VOC. Van Imhoff proposed improving education efforts and the work of the Protestant Church in the colony.

In May 1743, Imhoff began his tenure in Batavia, which was in the midst of a war. The Javanese princes took advantage of the chaotic situation following Valckenier's actions to begin a war against the VOC. Van Imhoff succeeded in reestablishing peace and began several reforms. He founded a Latin school, opened the first post offices in the Dutch East Indies, built a hospital and launched a newspaper. He also founded the city of Buitenzorg and suppressed opium trade. In 1746, Imhoff embarked on a tour of Java to inspect the company's holdings and decided on several institutional reforms.

Van Imhoff's tenure was also marked by catastrophe. A ship, the Hofwegen, was struck by lightning and exploded in the port of Batavia along with six tons of silver, totalling around 600,000 Dutch florins. Ultimately, Imhoff's progressive policies made him many enemies. Van Imhoff's want of diplomacy and his lack of respect for local customs caused the colony to become embroiled in the third war of Javanese succession.

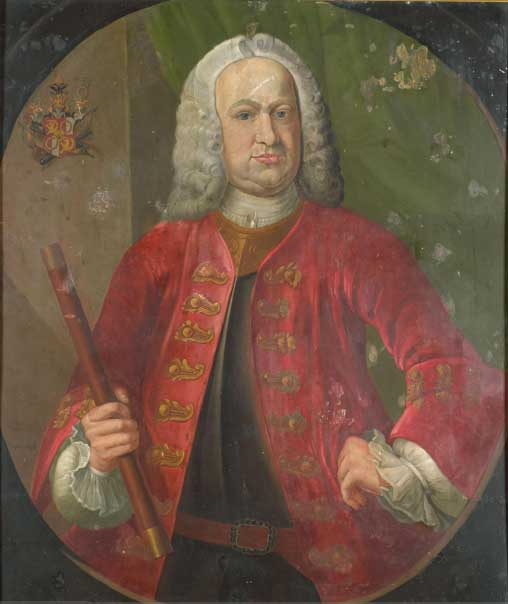

Put in an untenable position by his enemies, Imhoff wanted to resign from his post, but the VOC would not allow it. Van Imhoff was forced to remain in office until his death in 1750, having come to believe that most of his work had been done in vain. During his stay in Batavia, Imhoff stayed in a historic governor's residence. The original 18th-century building is restored as Toko Merah.
