= Matthijs Quast =

Dutch merchant and explorer (?-1641)

Matthijs Hendrikszoon Quast (died 6 October 1641), anglicized as Matthys and Matthew Quast, was a Dutch merchant and explorer in the service of the Dutch East India Company (VOC). Quast made several voyages on the VOC's behalf to Tokugawa Japan, the Qing Empire (China), and Ayutthaya Kingdom ("Siam") but is primarily remembered for his failed 1639 expedition in search of the phantom islands of Rica de Oro and Rica de Plata previously reported by Spanish mariners. He is sometimes credited with the first recorded discovery of the Bonin Islands during the voyage, although the VOC did nothing with the information and they remained unimportant and sparsely settled until the 19th century.

== 1639 Expedition ==
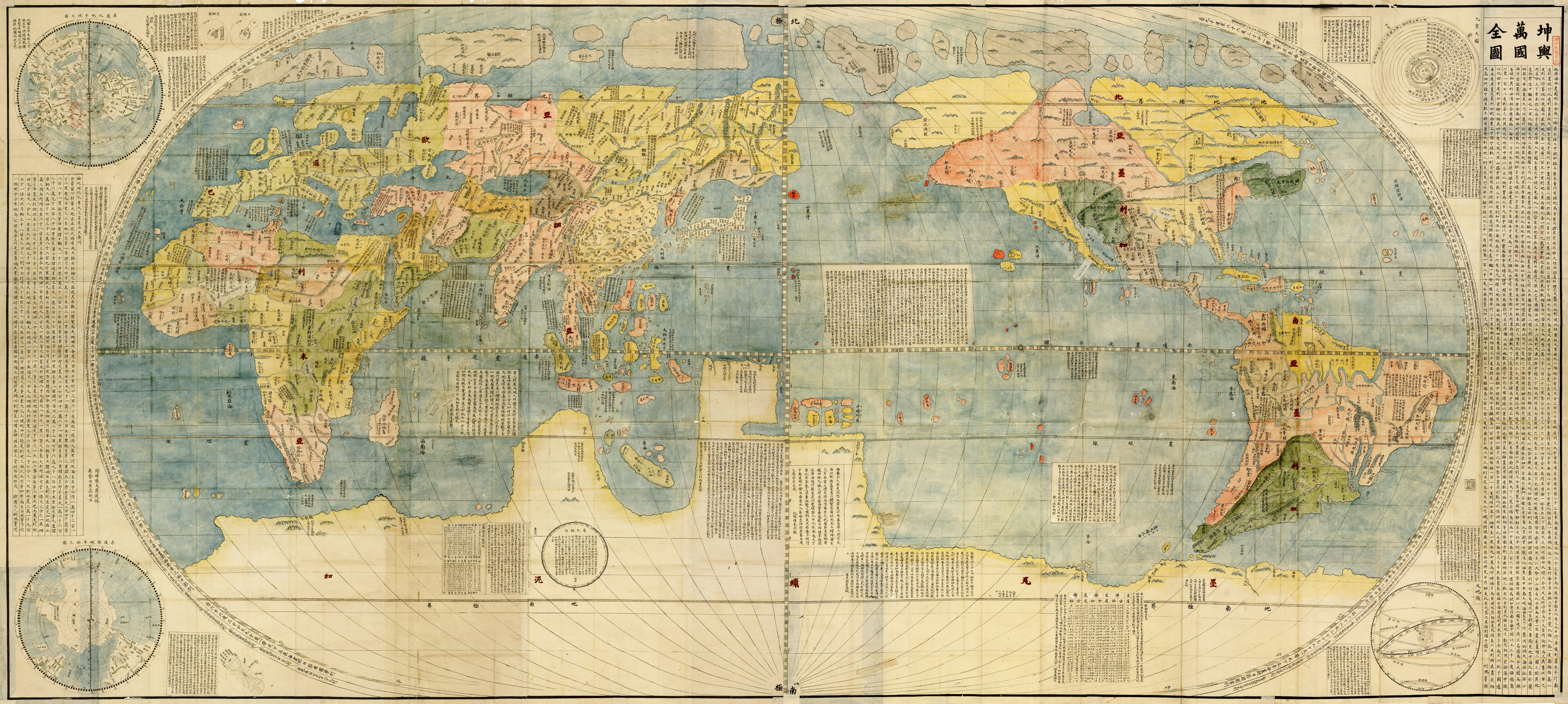
The c. 1604 Japanese edition of Matteo Ricci's Kunyu Wanguo Quantu world map, which pointedly added Kinshima and Ginshima to the original in the North Pacific east of Honshu. The islands continued to appear in Japanese world maps until after the Meiji Restoration in the mid-19th century but could not be located by Quast's expedition... or anyone else after.

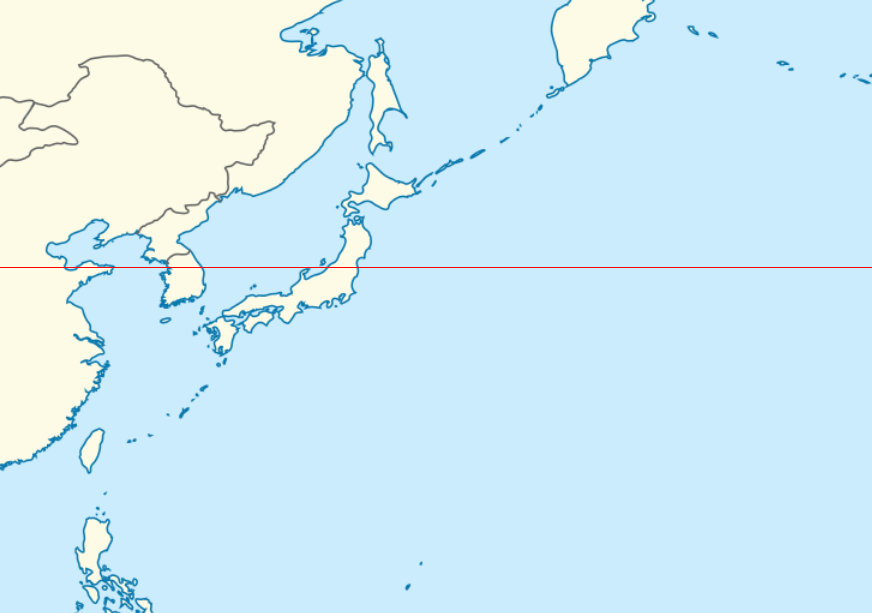
The circle of latitude at 37° 30′ N., the supposed location of the islands Rica de Oro and Plata according to the Dejima trader Willem Verstegen. The line crosses the Shatsky Rise and Emperor Seamounts but nothing at or near sea level.

Claims that southern or eastern seas held islands rich with gold and silver are at least as old as the ancient Greeks, who called them Chryse and Argyre. Spanish mariners had placed their Isla Rica de Oro and Rica de Plata ("Island Rich with Gold" and "with Silver") at various locations around the North Pacific for decades. Quast's expedition was occasioned by a 7 December 1635 report from Willem Verstegen, a VOC trader at Dejima off Nagasaki, that seemed to verify the Spanish claims, placing Kinshima (金島, "Island of Gold") and Ginshima (銀島, "Island of Silver") somewhere vaguely east of Honshu. (For his part, Verstegen specifically located the islands to be discovered at 37° 30′ N. somewhere within 400 mijls of the Japanese coast.) The VOC officials at the eastern headquarters of Batavia on Java in the Dutch East Indies (now Jakarta, Indonesia) were unimpressed and uninterested but were eventually overruled by the heeren back in the Netherlands, who ordered them to investigate.

Quast was instructed to go to the area matching the Spanish and Japanese accounts by way of the Philippines and then to continue northwest from there to explore Korea and the possibilities for a Northeast Passage around Mongolia, Manchuria, and Siberia ("Tartary"). The VOC reserving its good ships for trading voyages with certain profit upon completion, the expedition was given the two small and run-down ships Engel (Dutch for "Angel") and Graft or Gracht ("Urban Canal"). Quast and his commander Lucas Albertsen used the Engel as the flagship while his lieutenant Abel Tasman—now famous for his later voyages to Australia—captained the Gracht.

The expedition left Batavia on 2 June 1639. It passed Luzon into the open water of the Pacific on 10 July. Eager to find the two islands, Quast raised the bonus for the first person to sight land. Simultaneously, he more seriously penalized anyone found asleep on watch: fifty lashes and a fine of a month's pay on the first offense, twice as much for the second, and death for the third. Systematically crossing the sea in the areas indicated, reaching as far as 42° N. and 177° E., the two ships discovered or rediscovered the entirely uninhabited Bonin Islands (Note: The names their log records for the larger islands they found were Hooge Meeuwen Island (Dutch: t'Hooge Meuwen Eylandt, "the High Seagull Island") for North Iwo Jima in the Volcanos and Engel's or Engel Island (Engels Eylandt) for Hahajima and Gracht's, Graft's, or Graft Island (Graghts Eylandt) for Chichijima in the Bonins.) but found nothing even vaguely resembling what they were looking for. The crew decimated by illness exacerbated by poor rations and the ships beginning to fail, Quast finally abandoned his fruitless search on 25 October. Bad as things were, he directed his men to sail for Fort Zeelandia on Taiwan (now within Tainan's Anping District) rather than attempting to continue northwest. By the time his men reached Tayouan and its fort on 24 November, 41 of the 90 men who had sailed with Quast had died.

== Legacy ==
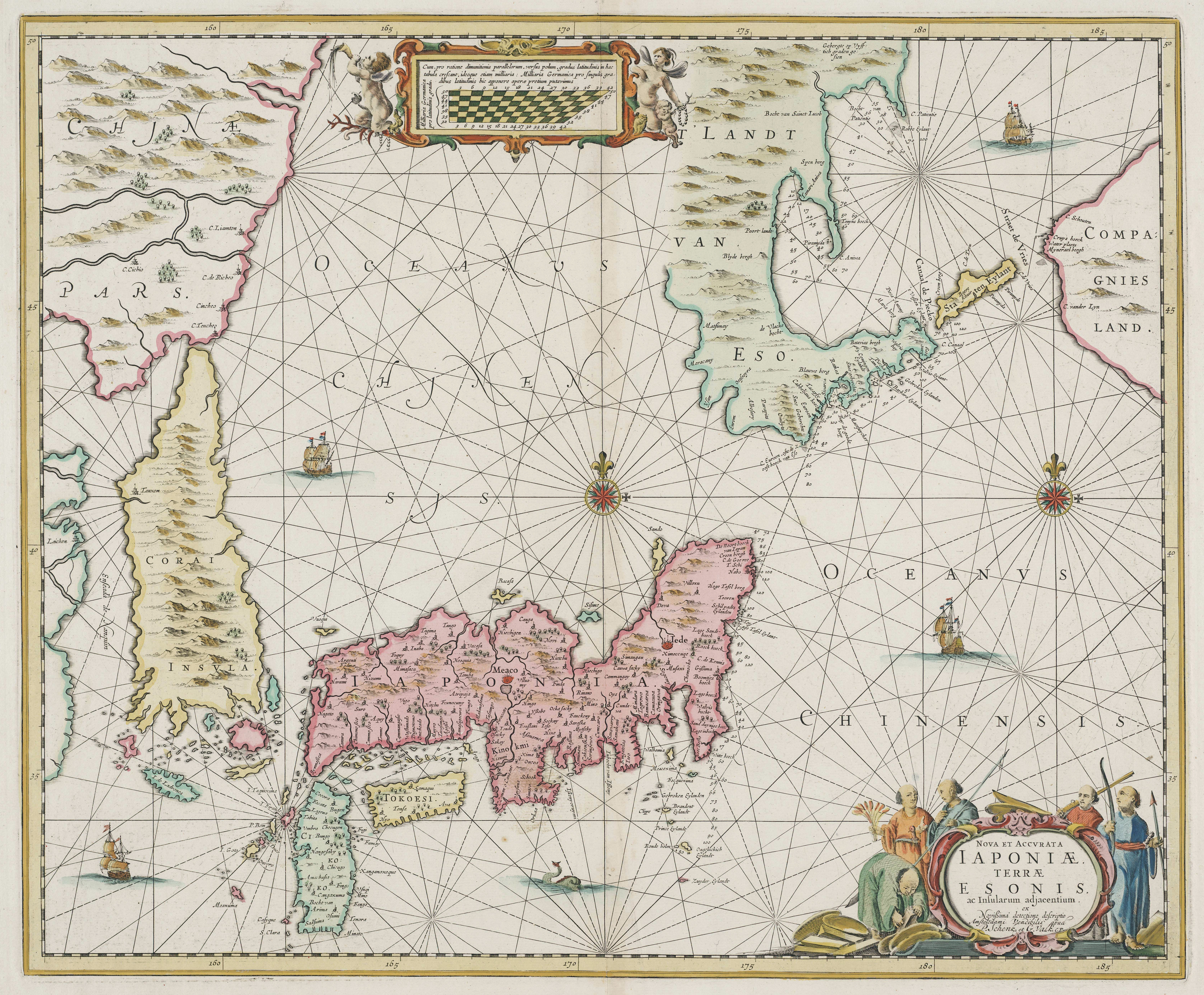
Jan Janssonius's 1652 map of Japan, incorporating the discoveries of Quast's journey and the discoveries and misinformation of De Vries's

Uninhabited, remote, and without known resources or harbors, the Bonins were entirely ignored by the Dutch East India Company as they had been ignored by any Spanish before them, permitting their rediscovery and colonization by the Japanese in the next century. Quast's expedition added some detail to Dutch charts of the southern coast of Japan but nothing vital or profitable; it long lingered in complete obscurity until Philipp Franz von Siebold rediscovered its logs after noticing charts of Dutch islands in the area of the rediscovered Bonins. The final leg of his mission which he had been unable to complete was given to Martin de Vries, whose expedition explored Hokkaido, Sakhalin, and the southern Kurils in 1643.
