= Willem Maurits Bruyninck =

Governor of Ceylon

25th Governor of Zeylan
- In office 12 March 1740 – 8 January 1742
- Preceded by: Gustaaf Willem van Imhoff
- Succeeded by: Daniel Overbeek

Willem Maurits Bruijninck (also Bruyninck, Bruijnink, Bruinink, Bruninck, etc.) (24 January 1689 Lichtenvoorde - ?) was the 25th Governor of Ceylon during the Dutch period in Ceylon. He was appointed on 12 March 1740 and was Governor until 8 January 1742. He was succeeded by Daniel Overbeek.

Bruijninck was the oldest son of Wilhelmina Verwitt and Peter Bruijninck, voogd (custodian/governor) of Lichtenvoorde for the lord of Bronckhorst and Borculo. Willem Maurits joined the Dutch East India Company and had risen to opperkoopman ("upper-merchant") before 1735. From 1735 to 1737 he was Governor of the Sumatran West Coast and commissary of the silver and gold mines of Salida near Padang. He was married to Hermina Helena Tolling.

Government offices
Preceded by Gustaaf Willem van Imhoff	Governor of Zeylan; 1740-1742	Succeeded by Daniel Overbeek
