= Daniel Overbeek =

26th Governor of Zeylan
- In office 8 January 1742 – 11 May 1743
- Preceded by: Willem Maurits Bruyninck
- Succeeded by: Julius Valentyn Stein van Gollenesse

Daniel Overbeek or Overbeke (13 March 1695, Amsterdam - 29 July 1751, Colombo) was the 26th Governor of Ceylon during the Dutch period in Ceylon. He was appointed on 8 January 1742 and was Governor until 11 May 1743. He was succeeded by Julius Valentyn Stein van Gollenesse.

From 15 May 1717 to 13 March 1718 Overbeek sailed from Holland to Ceylon on the ship "Vaderland Getrouw". Only four months later (22 July 1718) he married Elisabeth Hals, the daughter of the captain of the burghers in Colombo. By 1737 Overbeek was Commander of Galle. Elizabeth had five children, but died in October 1738 in Galle. Overbeek remarried Gertruida Brengman.

Government offices
Preceded by Willem Maurits Bruyninck	Governor of Zeylan; 1742-1743	Succeeded by Julius Valentyn Stein van Gollenesse
