= Andreas Cleyer =

German physician, pharmacist, botanist, trader and Japanologist

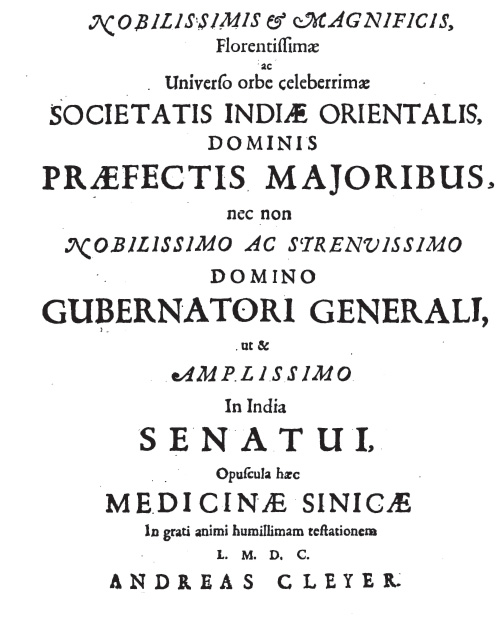
Frontispiece of the book: "Specimen Medicinae Sinicae", 1682

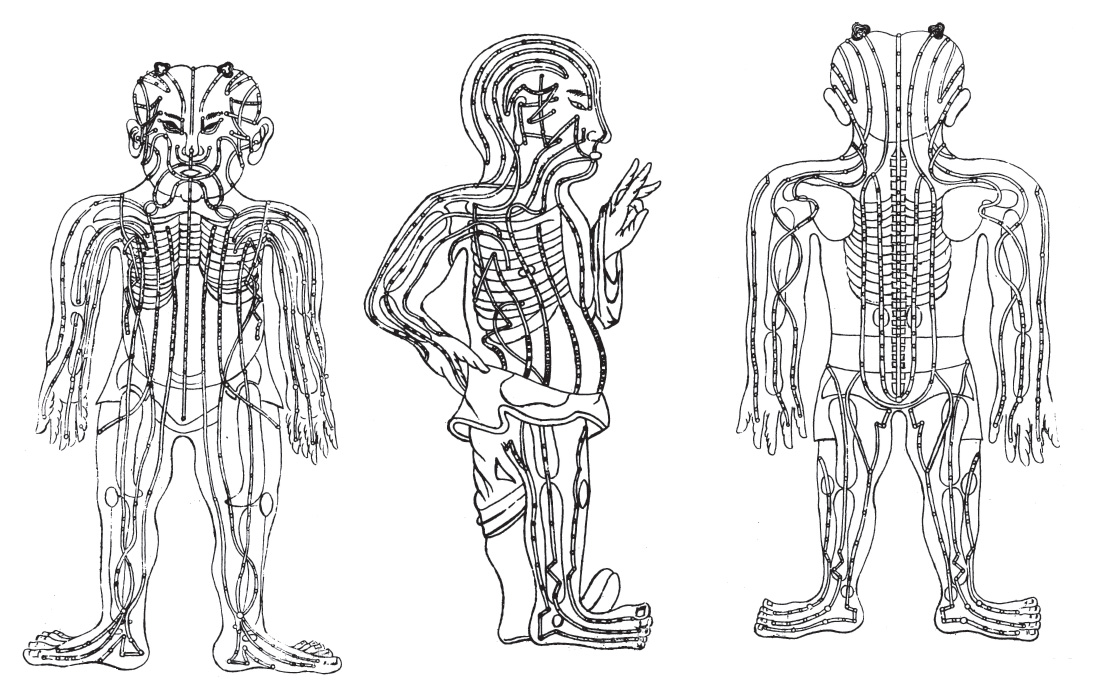
Acupuncture meridians in Cleyer's "Specimen Medicinae Sinicae"

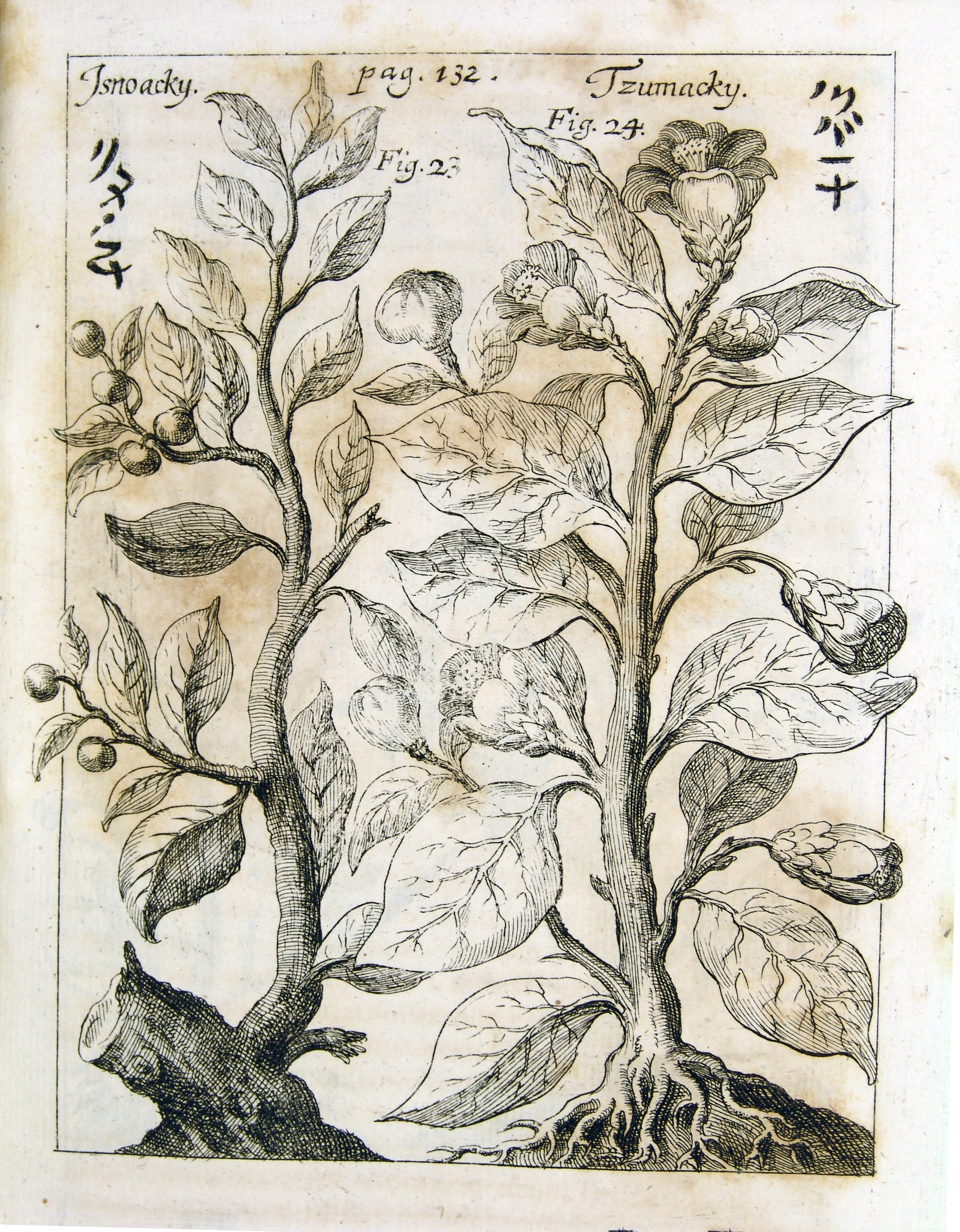
Cleyer's observations on Camellia (tsubaki) and Distylium racemosum (isunoki) published in the Miscellanea Curiosa, Decuria II, Annus VII

Andreas Cleyer (27 June 1634 – between 20 December 1697 and 26 March 1698) was a German physician, pharmacist, botanist, trader and Japanologist.

== Biography ==
Andreas Cleyer could be called a "soldier of fortune." He began as a modest soldier, and he made his fortune and reputation during the course of a career. He rose in the ranks of the Dutch East India Company (Vereenigde Oostindische Compagnie, VOC), becoming a respected and well-known figure in the VOC's Batavian society.

- 1666: Andreas Cleyer, who had studied medicine and had acquired a license to practice medicine, came initially to Southeast Asia as a naval cadet (adelborst) of the VOC. His medical background led to a better posting as the manager of the VOC's military hospital pharmacy in Batavia and later the city pharmacy too. During this period, he also became rector of the Latin school.
- 1680: Cleyer was appointed a member of the Council of Justices (Raad van Justitië) in Batavia.
- 1682–1683: The Council of the Indies (Raad van Indië) at Batavia named Cleyer as Opperhoofd of the VOC trading post (factorij) at Dejima in Japan. His first period of duty encompassed October 20, 1682, through November 8, 1683. Assisted by his gardener George Meister, Cleyer conducted botanical investigations and reported his observations in numerous letters addressed to scholars throughout Europe.
- 1685–1686: Cleyer returned again to Dejima from October 17, 1685, through November 5, 1686. On this occasion, he was banished from Japan by the Tokugawa authorities. He was reproached for failing in his duty to control smuggling.

Cleyer added to western botanical, zoological and medical knowledge in the course of his time in Southeast Asia. His collecting and categorizing activities were noteworthy in their number and extent. His name can be found in many 17th century travel accounts (e.g. Heinrich Muche, Johann Wilhelm Vogel, Johann Konrad Rätzel).

== Scientific treatises ==
Cleyer's published work is still available in rare book collections.

- Specimen Medicinae Sinicae, sive Opuscula Medica ad Mentem Sinensium. Zubrodt, Frankfurt 1682. (as the treatise mentioned below only edited by Cleyer and written by Michał Boym).
- Clavis medica ad Chinarum doctrinam de pulsibus / autore Michaele Boymo … in lucem Europaeam produxit Cl. Dn. Andreas Cleyerus …. Norimbergae, 1686. (written by the Polish Jesuit M. Boym and edited by Cleyer)
- Excerpts from Cleyers letters were translated into Latin and published in the “Miscellanea curiosa medico-physica Academiae naturae curiosorum sive Ephemerides Germanicae” (See Michel, 1991):

1683: Decuria II, Annus I

- Observatio 16, De Ovo gallinaceo, cum serpentis imagine in testâ.
- Observatio 17, De Ovo gallinaceo praegnante & epate gallinarum insigni.
- Observatio 18, De Corporibus sphaericis permultis in ventriculo humano inventis.

1684: Decuria II, Annus II

- Observatio 5, De Elephantia Javae novae.
- Observatio 7, De Serpente magno Indiae Orientalis, Urobubalum deglutiente.
- Observatio 8, De Nube pyramidali in Oceano attractiva.

1685: Decuria II, Annus III

- Observatio 13, De S.Thomae Christianis Indiae Or. pedibus strumosis.

1686: Decuria II, Annus IV

- Observatio 1, De Moxa.
- Observatio 2, De Radice Gensingh.
- Observatio 3, De Catechu.
- Observatio 4, De Herba Thee.
- Observatio 5, De Fructu Ananas.
- Observatio 6, De Cinnamomo & Cassia lignea.
- Observatio 92, De Japanensium arbusculis Tzudzinsic dictis.

1687: Decuria II, Annus V

- Observatio 40, De Arbore laccifera Japanensi Fasnoky sive Namra.
- Observatio 41, De Arbore Mami Itabo Japonensium.

1688: Decuria II, Annus VI

- Observatio 49, De Cicadis Indicis.
- Observatio 52, De Planta Japanica Vinganfana.
- Observatio 53, De Duabus plantis aquaticis Japanensibus Koëbe & Fasnofana.
- Observatio 54, De Canschy & Fiewa Japanensium arboribus.

1689: Decuria II, Annus VII

- Observatio 70, De Plantis Japanensibus Isnoacky, Germ. Eyserholz / & Tsumacky.
- Observatio 71, De Plantis Japanensibus Cumi Gummi & Miaco Bana.
- Observatio 72, De Plantis Japanensibus Kyrama & Fickofax.
- Observatio 73, De Plantis Japanensibus Nifum Schin ‘Srogat, Mominoky & Feggo

1690: Decuria II, Annus VIII

- Observatio 21, De Ceto minore ambrophago.
- Observatio 22, De Monstrosa animalia.
- Observatio 190, De Plantis Japanensibus Mitznofana & Fatasiro.
- Observatio 191, De Floribus Japanensibus Kanako Juri & Jama Juri.
- Observatio 192, De Arboribus Japanensibus Fisakaky & Tsutta.

1691: Decuria II, Annus IX

- Observatio 75, De Plantis Japanensibus Din nanscho & Omodto.
- Observatio 76, De Floribus Japanensibus Vohsnofana & Ghimi.
- Observatio 77, De Arboribus Japanensibus Kutzinèsch & Tobera-Nocky.

1692: Decuria II, Annus X

- Observatio 35, De Opio Aphrodisiaco.
- Observatio 36, De Arboribus Japonensium Itabe & Hambu.
- Observatio 37, De Arbore Camphorifera Japonensium Kusnoky dicta.
- Observatio 38, De Plantis Japonensium Ran & Schoboe.

1695: Decuria III, Annus II

- Observatio 179, De Plantis Japanensibus Jamaran & Decku.
- Observatio 180, De Fruticibus Japanensibus Tzinsinqua & Daniwathas.
- Observatio 181, De Floribus Japanensibus Schinobu & Tzooschinkiku.
- Observatio 182, De Arboribus Japanensibus Meehebii & Insur.

1696: Decuria III, Annus III

- Observatio 118, De Arbore Japonensium Tschooditsoo sive Tschoot-Itzu.
- Observatio 119, De Floribus Japonensium Kuko sive Asangu & Zuri-Jani.
- Observatio 120, De Plantis Japonensium Zumani & Jamiuncka sive Jamamiuncka.

1700: Decuria III, Annus V & VI

- Observatio1, De Plantis Japonensibus Joosie.
- Observatio 2, De Arboribus Japonensibus Gummy & Fiaku Schyqua.
- Observatio 3, De Fruticibus Japonensibus Tsingkikoe & Fana datzibana.

== Other materials ==
- Flora Japanica. (unpublished collection of Japanese plant and bird drawings)

== See also ==
- VOC Opperhoofden in Japan
- Sakaki
