= Isaac van Schinne =

Dutch merchant/trader

Isaäc van Schinne (1640–1686) was an opperhoofd in Deshima between 1681 and 1682.

Isaac was baptized on 12 February 1640 in Middelburg. He married in that city on 12 October 1667 to Catharina Dammaert (1646–1683). His son Isaac was born in Veere. In 1676 he arrived in Deshima; after a year he left, but in 1679 he went again. In 1681 he was appointed as chief of the factory. After one year he had to leave. After his wife died he remarried the widow Aletta de Bitter (1654–1708). Early in 1684 they left Batavia and arrived in Middelburg later that year. Van Schinne was buried there on 18 September 1686; after a few years his widow and their daughter moved to Utrecht.
