= Opperhoofd =

Dutch term meaning 'village chief'

Opperhoofd is a Dutch word (plural opperhoofden) that literally translates to "upper-head", meaning "supreme headman". The Danish cognate overhoved (previously spelled opperhoved), which is a calque derived from a Danish pronunciation of the Dutch or Low German word, is also treated here. The standard German cognate is Oberhaupt.

In modern Dutch, opperhoofd remains in use for a native tribal chief, such as a sachem of Native Americans. Despite the superlative etymology, it can be applied to several chiefs in a single native community. The derived Danish word høvding also carries this same meaning.

However, this article is devoted to its more former, historical use as a gubernatorial title, comparable to the English chief factor, for the chief executive officer of a Dutch factorij in the sense of trading post, as led by a factor, i.e. agent.

The etymologically cognate title of Danish overhoved (singular) had a similar gubernatorial use (sometimes rendered in English as station chief), notably on the Danish Gold Coast. (Note: see List of colonial governors of the Danish Gold Coast)

== Dutch colonial opperhoofden ==
=== In Asia ===
The factory established on 20 September 1609 at Hirado by the Dutch East India Company (Vereenigde Oostindische Compagnie, VOC), next in 1641, as the Dutch factorij was moved by order of the shogunate thereto, on Dejima (Desjima in purist Dutch, or Latinized as Decima) Island, in Nagasaki Bay. The trading post was maintained under the Dutch state after the 1795 end of VOC administration till on 28 February 1860 Dejima was abandoned. (Note: for a full list of its opperhoofden, see VOC opperhoofden in Japan)

=== In Africa ===
- The Dutch Fort Patience, was established by the Dutch East India Company in March 1721 as a naval support point at Maputo Bay near the current nation of Mozambique's capital of Maputo. It was subordinate to the Dutch Cape colony. The Dutch abandoned the post on 27 December 1730.
- Mauritius, since 1638 a Dutch colony under the chartered VOC, was governed by an opperhoofd until it was abandoned on 17 February 1710. In September 1715, the island was claimed for France and renamed Île de France by the passing French sailor Guillaume Dufresne d'Arsel.

== See also ==
- Captain-major
