= Travis (surname) =

- Language: English

Origin
- Language: Anglo-Norman Old French
- Origin: traverser "to cross"
- Meaning: to cross over

Other names
- Variant form: Travers
- Derivative: Travis

Travis is a surname.

== Notable people with the surname "Travis" include ==
- Abby Travis (born 1969), American bassist
- Bill Travis (born 1957), American photographer
- Cecil Travis (1913–2006), American baseball infielder
- Christopher K. Travis, American consultant and project designer
- Clay Travis (born 1979), American sports journalist
- Curtis Travis, American politician from Alabama
- Dave Lee Travis (born 1945), British radio presenter
- Debbie Travis (born 1960), Canadian television personality
- Edward Travis (1888–1956), British cryptographer and intelligence officer
- Eugene M. Travis (1863–1940), American politician and New York State Comptroller 1915–1920
- Francis Travis (1921–2017), American-born Swiss conductor
- George Travis (1741–1797), English clergyman
- Jalen Travis (born 2002), American football player
- Jody Travis (born 1965), American television personality, multiple kidnapping and attempted murder victim
- Joe Lane Travis (born 1931), American politician
- John Travis (disambiguation), multiple people
- Jordan Travis (born 2000), American football player
- Joseph Travis (born 1953), American academic
- Julius Travis (1869–1961), Justice of the Indiana Supreme Court
- Kylie Travis (born 1970), Australian actress
- Matthew Travis (fl. 1990s–2020s), American businessman and government official
- Maury Travis (1965–2002), American serial killer
- Merle Travis (1917–1983), American country and western singer
- Michael Travis (born 1965), American jamband drummer and member of The String Cheese Incident
- Michael Travis (soccer) (born 1993), South African footballer
- Nancy Travis (born 1961), American actress
- Randy Travis (born 1959), American country singer
- Reid Travis (born 1995), American basketball player
- Richard Travis (1884–1918), New Zealand soldier
- Richard Travis (actor) (1913–1989), American actor
- Robert F. Travis (1904–1950), United States Army Air Forces general
- Robert S. Travis (1909–1980), American politician
- Robert S. Travis Jr. (born 1947), American politician
- Ross Travis (born 1993), American football player
- Ryan Travis (born 1989), American football player
- Scott Travis (born 1961), American rock drummer
- Stacey Travis (born 1966), American actress
- Tiffany Travis (born 1978), American former basketball player
- Walter Travis (1862–1927), Australian-born American golfer
- William B. Travis (1809–1836), commander of the Texian forces at the Battle of the Alamo
