= Traviss =

Traviss is a surname. Notable people with the surname include:

- Karen Traviss, British science fiction author
- Reg Traviss (born 1977), British film director and writer

== See also ==
- Travers (surname)
- Travis (surname)
