= Council of Four =

Council of Four may refer to:

- The Big Four (World War I), the top Allied leaders who met at the Paris Peace Conference in January 1919
- Council of Four (India), a political body of 18th century India
- Council of Four Lands, the central body of Jewish authority in Poland from 1580 to 1764
