= Governor Fendall =

Governor Fendall may refer to:

- John Fendall Jr. (1762–1825), Governor of Java in 1816
- Josias Fendall (1620s–1687), 4th Proprietary Governor of Maryland from 1656 to 1660
