= Stamford Raffles =

British colonial official (1781–1826)

Sir Stamford Raffles FRS FRAS
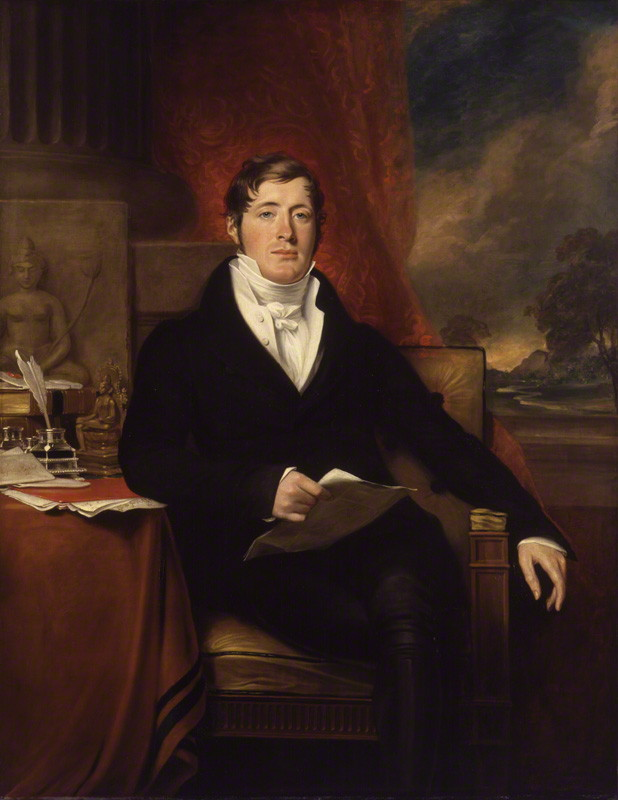
- Portrait of Stamford Raffles (c. 1817)

Lieutenant-Governor of Bencoolen
- In office 22 March 1818 – 1824
- Monarchs: George III; George IV
- Preceded by: George John Siddons (as Resident of Bencoolen)
- Succeeded by: John Prince (as Resident)

British Lieutenant-Governor of the Dutch East Indies
- In office 18 September 1811 – 12 March 1816
- Appointed by: Earl of Minto
- Monarch: George III
- Preceded by: Robert Rollo Gillespie (acting)
- Succeeded by: John Fendall

Personal details
- Born: Thomas Stamford Bingley Raffles; 5 July 1781 near Port Morant, Jamaica
- Died: 5 July 1826 (aged 45) Middlesex, England
- Resting place: St Mary's Church, Hendon
- Spouses: Olivia Mariamne Devenish (m. 1805; died 1814) Sophia Hull (m. 1817)
- Children: 5
- Known for: Founding years of modern Singapore
- Scientific career
- Known for: The History of Java
- Fields: Botany, zoology
- Author abbrev. (botany): Raffles
- Author abbrev. (zoology): Raffles

Sir Thomas Stamford Bingley Raffles (5 July 1781 – 5 July 1826) was a British colonial official who served as the governor of the Dutch East Indies between 1811 and 1816 and lieutenant-governor of Bencoolen between 1818 and 1824. Raffles was involved in the capture of the Indonesian island of Java from the Dutch during the Napoleonic Wars. It was returned under the Anglo–Dutch Treaty of 1824. He also wrote The History of Java in 1817, describing the history of the island from ancient times. The Rafflesia flowers were named after him.

Raffles also played a role in further establishing the British Empire's reach in East and Southeast Asia. He secured control over the strategically located Singapore from local rulers in 1819 to secure British access along the Strait of Singapore and the nearby seas in the region, particularly the Indian Ocean and the South China Sea. His actions were initially not endorsed by the British government and led to tensions between the British and the Dutch. The Anglo–Dutch Treaty of 1824 established their respective spheres of influence, the Dutch relinquishing their claims to Singapore while the British ceded Bencoolen to them. A transshipment port was subsequently established in Singapore for maritime trade between Europe and Asia.

While Raffles was largely credited for the founding of contemporary Singapore, the early running of day-to-day operations was mostly done by William Farquhar, who served as the first Resident of Singapore from 1819 to 1823. Raffles returned to England in 1824 and died on his 45th birthday in 1826. In Singapore, his legacy is commemorated by the Raffles's Landing Site and the use of his name for numerous national institutions. However, his historical role has become a subject of public debate, with critics characterising him as an imperialist. These perspectives argue that celebratory narratives of colonialism can overlook the history of the population that predated his arrival.

== Career ==
Thomas Stamford Bingley Raffles was born on 5 July 1781 on board the ship Ann, off the coast of Port Morant, Jamaica, to Captain Benjamin Raffles and Anne Raffles (née Lyde). Benjamin served as a ship master for various ships engaged in the direct trade between England and the West Indies. Although some biographers have suggested that Benjamin was involved in the slave trade, modern historians have refuted such claims. When Benjamin ended his involvement in the West India trade in 1800, it caused his family considerable hardship. He was a Free Mason. The little money the family had went into sending the young Raffles to the Mansion House Academy, Hammersmith, a moderately priced boarding school, offering Latin, Greek, French, arithmetic, bookkeeping and geography, that specialised in preparing boys for clerkships or the army. In 1795, at the age of 14, Raffles started working in London as a clerk for the East India Company. Nine years later, in 1804, the 23-year-old Raffles married Olivia Mariamne Devenish, a widow 10 years his senior, who was formerly married to Jacob Cassivelaun Fancourt, an assistant surgeon in Madras, who had died in 1800.

In 1805, he was sent to Penang Island in British Malaya, starting his long association with Southeast Asia. He started as assistant secretary, under Philip Dundas, the new governor of Penang. At this time, he also made the acquaintance of Thomas Otho Travers, who would accompany him for the next 20 years.

== Java Island ==
=== British invasion of Java ===
His knowledge of the Malay language, as well as his wit and ability, gained him favour with Lord Minto, the then governor-general of India, and he was sent to Malacca.

In 1811, after the annexation of the Kingdom of Holland by France during the Napoleonic Wars, Raffles had no choice but to leave the country. He mounted a military expedition against the Dutch and French in Java, in the Dutch East Indies. The war was swiftly conducted by Admiral Robert Stopford, General Frederick Augustus Wetherall, and Colonel Robert Rollo Gillespie, who led a well-organised army against an opposing army of mostly French conscripts with little proper leadership.

The previous Dutch governor, Herman Willem Daendels, had built a well-defended fortification at Meester Cornelis, now Jatinegara. His successor, Governor Jan Willem Janssens, who coincidentally had surrendered to the British five years earlier at the Cape Colony, mounted a brave but ultimately futile defence at the fortress. The British, led by Colonel Gillespie, stormed the fort and captured it within three hours. Governor Janssens attempted to escape inland but was captured.

The British invasion of Java took a total of 45 days, during which Raffles was appointed the lieutenant-governor of the Dutch East Indies by Lord Minto before hostilities formally ceased. He took his residence at Buitenzorg, and despite having a small group of Britons as his senior staff, kept many of the Dutch civil servants in the governmental structure.

=== Rule ===
During the relatively brief period of British rule in Java, Raffles negotiated several peace treaties along with ordering several military expeditions against local rulers. Rumours of plans by the Yogyakarta Sultanate to launch an attack against the British led to uneasiness among Britons in Java. On 20 June 1812, Raffles led a 1,200-strong British force to capture the Royal Palace of Yogyakarta. Yogyakarta forces, surprised by the attack, were easily defeated; the palace fell in one day, and was subsequently sacked and burnt. Raffles ordered much of the palace's archives to be removed, taking them back with him. The attack was unprecedented in Javanese history, as it was the first time an indigenous palace had been captured by a European army, humiliating the Yogyakarta Sultanate.

Although peace returned to Central Java in the immediate aftermath of the attack, it may have fuelled the deep-seated instability and hostility to European involvement in the region that ultimately gave rise to the Java War during the 1820s. Raffles also ordered an expedition to Palembang, Sumatra to depose local sultan Mahmud Badaruddin II. The expedition was also ordered to occupy the nearby Bangka Island in order to establish a permanent British presence in the area, in case Java returned to Dutch rule after the end of the War of the Sixth Coalition in Europe.

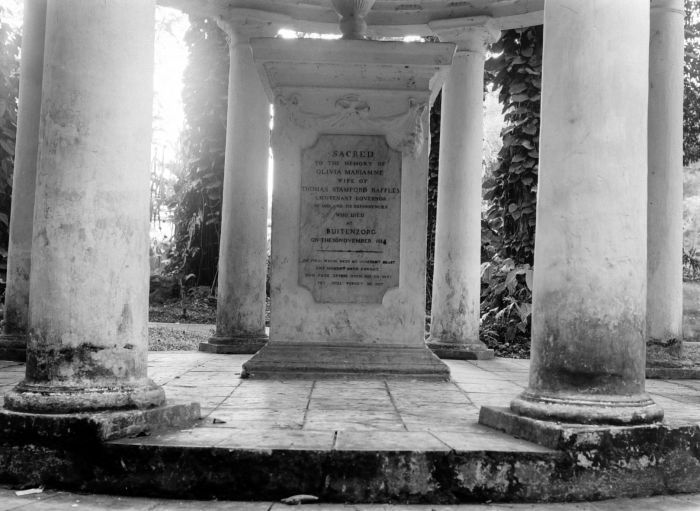
The memorial to Olivia Mariamne Raffles, Raffles's first wife, erected by him along the Kanarielaan in the National Botanical Gardens (now the Bogor Botanical Gardens). Raffles re-landscaped these gardens, which were established in 1744 in Buitenzorg (now Bogor), West Java.

During his lieutenant-governorship, Raffles placed some restrictions on the local slave trade in line with wider British policy across its Asian territories, although slavery remained widespread and Raffles himself was served by a large retinue of slaves at his official residences in Java. Raffles also attempted a replacement of the Dutch system of forced agricultural deliveries-in-kind with a cash-based land tenure system of land management, probably influenced by the earlier anti-feudal critiques of Dirk van Hogendorp. He was advised by a holdover from the previous Dutch regime on Java, the president of the High Court of Java, Herman Warner Muntinghe, especially in the matter of the reform of the public finances of the colony, and its system of taxation.

Under Raffles's aegis, a large number of ancient monuments in Java were systematically catalogued for the first time. The first detailed English-language account of Prambanan was prepared by Colin Mackenzie, while the Buddhist temple of Borobudur was surveyed and cleared of vegetation by H. C. Cornelius.

When his wife, Olivia, died on 26 November 1814, Raffles was devastated. In 1815, he left again for England shortly before the island of Java was returned to control of the Netherlands following the Napoleonic Wars, under the terms of the Anglo-Dutch Treaty of 1814. Raffles had been removed from his post by the East India Company ahead of the handover, and officially replaced by John Fendall Jr. on account of the poor financial performance of the colony during his administration, and allegations of financial impropriety on his own part. He sailed to England in early 1816 to clear his name and, en route, visited Napoleon, who was in exile at St. Helena, but found him unpleasant and unimpressive.

== Interlude in England ==
In 1817, Raffles wrote and published The History of Java, describing the history of the island from ancient times as well as its geography, flora, and fauna.

In 1817, Raffles was created a Knight Bachelor by the Prince Regent George IV, whose daughter, Princess Charlotte, was particularly close to him. At the publication of the book, he also stopped using the name 'Thomas', preferring to use his middle name, 'Stamford', possibly to avoid confusion amongst his associates with Sir Thomas Sevestre, or his cousin, Thomas Raffles, who both bore the same first name.

On 22 February, he married his second wife, Sophia Hull, and later set sail to Bencoolen (present-day Bengkulu in Indonesia) to take up his new post with his new wife.

== Bencoolen and Malaya ==
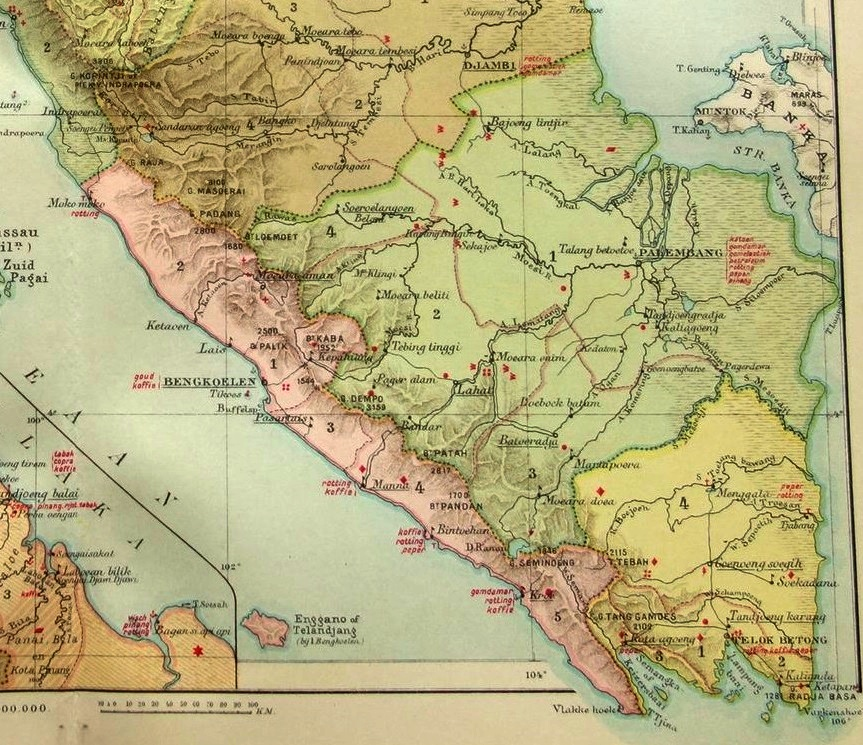
Territory of Bencoolen (pink)

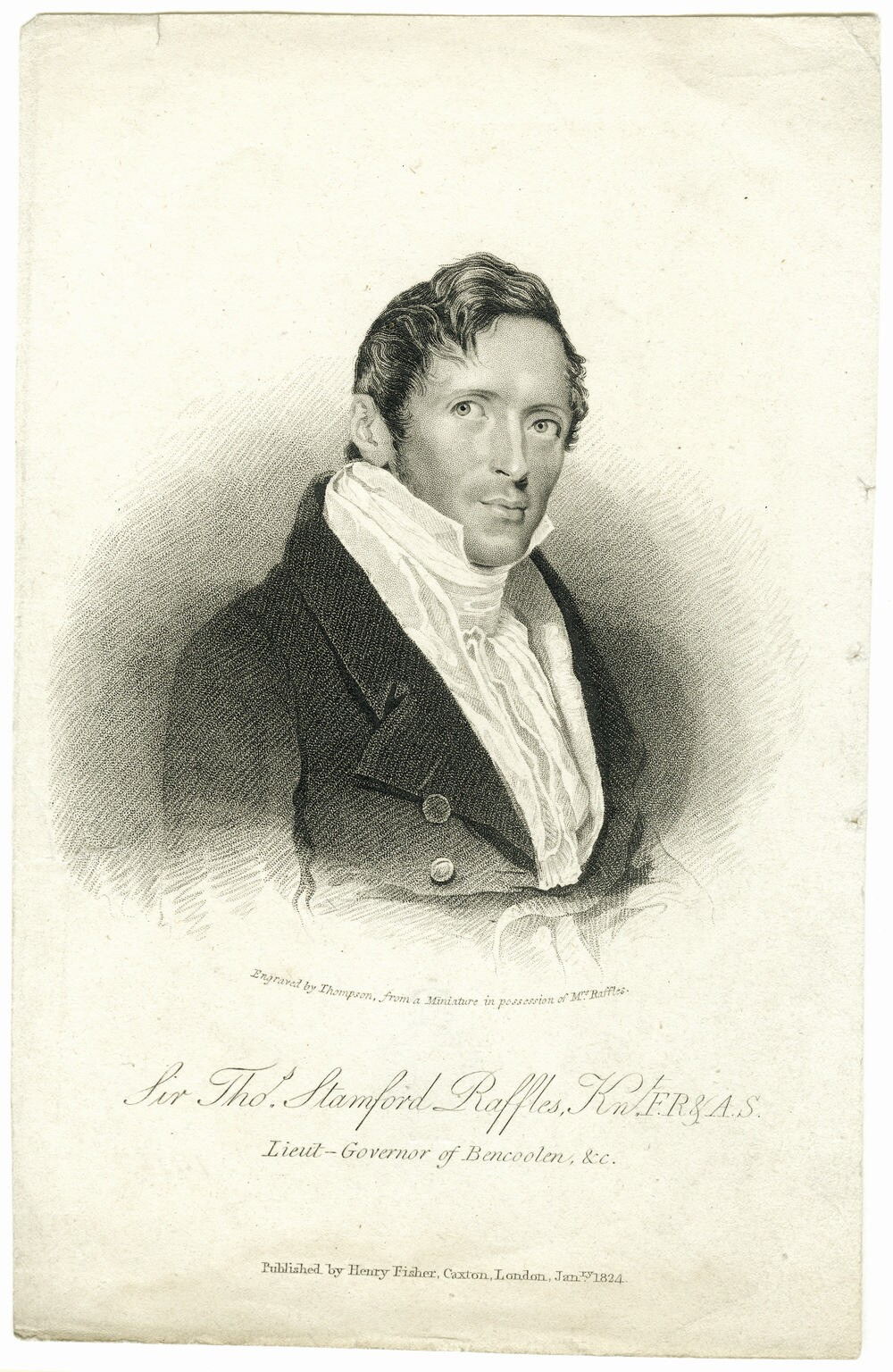
Stamford Raffles

Raffles arrived in Bencoolen on Sumatra on 19 March 1818, where he was appointed as the lieutenant-governor of Bencoolen on 22 March 1818. Despite the prestige connected with the title of Lieutenant-Governor, Bencoolen was a colonial backwater, whose only real export was pepper, and only the murder of a previous Resident, Thomas Parr, gained it any attention back home in Britain. Raffles found the place wrecked, and set about reforms immediately, mostly similar to what he had done on Java; abolishing slavery and limiting cockfighting and such games. To replace the slaves, he used a contingent of convicts, already sent to him from India.

It was at this point that he realised the importance of a British presence that both challenged the Dutch hegemony in the area, and could remain consistently profitable, unlike Bencoolen or Batavia. However, the strategic importance of poorly maintained but well-positioned British possessions, such as Penang or Bencoolen, made it impossible for the British to abandon the unprofitable colonies in such proximity to the Dutch in Java.

The competition in the area, between Raffles and the aggressive Dutch commissioner-general, Cornelis Theodorus Elout, and later Raffles' former advisor on Java, Muntinghe, now a member of the new High Government of the Dutch East Indies, who Elout had put in power, (Note: This led to an incident in Palembang where Muntinghe had an emissary of Raffles, one captain Salmond, deported to Batavia.) certainly led at least in part to the later Anglo-Dutch Treaty of 1824. Raffles looked into alternatives in the area; namely Bangka, which had been ceded to the Dutch after its conquest by the British during its occupation of Java. Bintan was also under consideration. Despite the fact that Francis Light overlooked the island before settling upon Penang in 1786, the Riau Archipelago was an attractive choice just to the south of the Malay Peninsula, for its proximity to Malacca.

In his correspondences with Calcutta, Raffles also emphasised the need to establish a certain amount of influence with the native chiefs, which had greatly waned since the return of the Dutch. Raffles sent Thomas Travers as an ambassador to the Dutch, to possibly negotiate an expansion of British economic interests. When this failed, and when Raffles's own expeditions into his new dominion found only treacherous terrain and few exportable goods, his desire to establish a better British presence was cemented.

However, the Anglo-Dutch Convention of 1814 was not completely clear, especially on the issue of certain possessions such as Padang. The Convention of 1814 only returned Dutch territory that was held before 1803, which did not include Padang. Raffles asserted the British claim personally, leading a small expedition to the Kingdom of Pagaruyung. Yet, as Raffles confirmed with the sultan regarding the absolute British influence of the area, he realised that the local rulers had only limited power over the well-cultivated and civilised country, and the treaty was largely symbolic, and had little actual force.

== Founding of modern Singapore ==
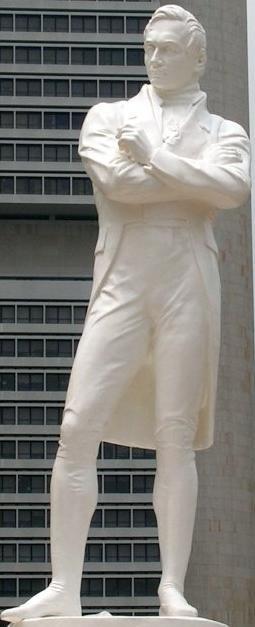
Statue of Sir Stamford Raffles in Singapore, based on the original by Thomas Woolner

Major-General William Farquhar, the British Resident of Malacca, had been attempting to negotiate commercial treaties with the local chiefs of the Riau Archipelago, especially before Raffles' arrival. Farquhar was compelled to sign the treaty not with the official head of the sultanate, but rather, the Raja Muda (Regent or Crown Prince) of Riau. He noted it as a success, and reported it as such to Raffles.

Raffles sailed to Malacca in late 1818, to personally secure a British presence in the Riau area, especially Singapura, which was favoured by him both through the readings of Malayan histories, and by Farquhar's explorations. Despite Lord Hastings' less-than-stellar opinion of Raffles before (which had necessitated his trip to England to clear his name at the end of his tenure as Lieutenant-Governor of Java), the now well-connected and successful Raffles was able to secure permission to set up a settlement. At this point in Singaporean history, the name Lion City was applied. The city was in a strategically advantageous position; however, he was ordered not to provoke the Dutch, and his subsequent actions were officially disavowed by the British government.

In London, Lord Castlereagh attempted to quell Dutch fears, and continuing efforts were made to reach an agreement between the nations that eventually became the Anglo-Dutch Treaty of London of 1824. As well as the treaty, instructions were sent out to Raffles to undertake far less intrusive actions; however, the long distance between the Far East and Europe meant that the orders had no chance of reaching Raffles in time.

=== Establishment ===
After a brief survey of the Karimun Islands, on 29 January 1819, he established a post at the southern tip of the Malay Peninsula. It was established that there was no Dutch presence on the island of Singapore. Johor also no longer had any control of the area, so contact was made with the Temenggong Abdul Rahman. The contacts were friendly, and Raffles, knowledgeable about the muddled political situation, took advantage to provide a rudimentary treaty between the nominal chiefs of the area that called for the exclusivity of trade, and the British protection of the area. Members of Raffles's party surveyed the island, and proceeded to request the presence of the sultan, or whoever at the time had supreme nominal power, to sign a formal treaty, while Major Farquhar was ordered to do the same in Rhio (Riau).

The writings of Raffles and Farquhar indicate that the British found Temenggong Abdul Rahman with 400 to 500 residents in Singapore in January 1819. Another member of the 1819 expedition party, Captain John Crawford, recalled in his diary an encounter with "upwards of 100" of Chinese. British colonial documentations revealed that Temenggong Abdul Rahman had provided these Chinese who were Teochews the cost and expenses of opening gambier plantations at Mount Stamford (now Pearl's Hill) prior to British arrival. He had also "in some instances" advanced money to the Teochew cultivators on the understanding he would be repaid in the form of gambier or other produce. Farquhar had the impressions that the Temenggong's interests in these plantations were represented by a brother-in-law of his named Baba Ketchil and the first Captain China of Singapore, a Teochew merchant named Tan Heng Kim ((陈亨钦), was "one of the principal persons concerned".

A few days later, the formal treaty was signed by Hussein Shah who claimed to be the "lawful sovereign of the whole of territories extending from Lingga and Johor to Mount Muar". Although Hussein Shah had had no previous contact with the British, he had certainly heard of the strength of the Royal Navy, and was in no position to argue against the terms. Raffles reassured him that the Dutch posed no threat in the area. Hussein Shah had been the crown Prince of Johor, but while he was away in Pahang to get married, his father died, and his younger brother was made sultan, supported by some of the court officials and the Dutch. To circumvent the situation of having to negotiate with a sultan influenced by the Dutch, Raffles decided to recognise, on behalf of the British Crown, Hussein Shah as being the rightful ruler of Johor.

Farquhar's attempt to establish a more favourable treaty in Rhio (Riau) was met with greater challenge, as the Dutch were present, and made for a rather awkward position. The Dutch were alarmed, and sent a small contingent to the island. Despite a covert offer of subterfuge against the Dutch offered by the Raja of Rhio (Riau), Farquhar returned, and an official protest was sent by the Raja to Java regarding the matter.

Raffles declared the foundation of what was to become modern Singapore on 6 February, securing the transfer of control of the island to the East India Company. With much pomp and ceremony, the official treaty was read aloud in languages representing all nations present, as well as the Malay and Chinese inhabitants.

Sultan Hussein Shah was paid 5,000 Spanish dollars a year, while Temenggong Abdul Rahman received 3,000 a year, both massive sums at the time, roughly equivalent to £287,000 and £172,000 now.

Farquhar was officially named the Resident of Singapore, and Raffles was named as 'Agent to the Most Noble the Governor-General with the States of Rhio (Riau), Lingin (Lingga) and Johor'. Although ownership of the post was to be exclusively British, explicit orders were given to Farquhar to maintain free passage of ships through the Strait of Singapore, and a small military presence was established alongside the trading post. After issuing orders to Farquhar and the remaining Europeans, Raffles left the next day, 7 February 1819.

=== Achin, and the early conflict with the Dutch ===
Raffles also planned to start a British presence in Achin, on the northern tip of Sumatra. As soon as he had departed, the Raja of Rhio (Riau) sent letters to the Dutch, disclaiming the deal, protesting innocence, and blaming British encroachment. Meanwhile, in Malacca, the Dutch acted at once, commanding that no Malays could go to Singapore. Raffles's bold claim of Singapore created a curious geographic situation: although Penang was clearly closer in distance to Singapore, Raffles, in his capacity as Lieutenant-Governor of Bencoolen, was nominally still in control. This undoubtedly irked the authorities in Penang, to the point where they refused to send any sepoys to Singapore to complete the garrison.

Official Dutch complaints came before the end of the month, and Raffles attempted to appease the situation by instructing Farquhar to not interfere with the politics of surrounding islands. Despite numerous threats and serious considerations by the Dutch governor-general Van der Capellen in Java, they did not take any military action. The confused political situation in Johore and Rhio also created a certain uneasiness and instability for the two nations. Tengku Long was claimed to be a pretender to the throne, and, since the succession laws in the Malay sultanates were not clear cut, treaties signed between native rulers and the European powers always seemed to be on the verge of invalidation; especially if a sultan should be deposed by one of his siblings or other pretenders.

Nonetheless, amidst uncertainty and intrigue, Raffles landed in Achin on 14 March 1819, with the begrudging help of Penang. Once again, it seems that multiple people were in power, but none wanted to formally deal with the British. The hostile atmosphere created allowed Raffles to cancel the only meeting he was able to arrange, with Panglima Polim, a powerful divisional chief, fearing treachery. As the influential merchant John Palmer, Raffles, and fellow commissioner John Monckton Coombs of Penang sat offshore, awaiting a response, Calcutta debated whether to reinforce the port city. Evacuation plans were made, but the Dutch never acted, and ultimately Lord Hastings prompted Colonel Bannerman, the governor of Penang, to send funds to bolster Singapore. Finally Raffles was capable of convincing his fellow commissioners to sign a treaty with Jauhar al-Alam Shah, the ruler of Achin, which installed a British Resident, as well as guaranteeing the exclusivity of bilateral trade.

By the time Raffles had returned to Singapore, on 31 May, much of the immediate crisis that the colony had caused in Penang and Calcutta had passed. By then, the initial five-hundred villagers had grown to become five-thousand merchants, soldiers, and administrators, packed onto the island. Raffles was determined to destroy the Dutch mercantile monopoly in the area, to replace it with a gateway for trade with China and Japan. The latter he had attempted but failed to reach an agreement with while governing Java.

=== First year of Singapore ===
While in Singapore, Raffles established schools and churches in the local languages. He allowed missionaries and local businesses to flourish. Certain colonial aspects remained: a European town was quickly built to segregate the population, separated by a river; carriage roads were built, and cantonments constructed for the soldiers. Otherwise, no other duties were imposed.

Confident that Farquhar would follow his instructions well, Raffles sailed for Bencoolen once again on 28 June.

== Bencoolen again ==
Raffles was still the lieutenant-governor of Bencoolen when he returned. Raffles started more reforms that were, by now, almost trademarks of his rule over the colonies. Forced labour was abolished when he first arrived, and he declared Bencoolen a free port as well. The currency was regulated and, as he had an excess of out-of-work civil servants, they formed committees to advise him on the daily running of the colony. However, Bencoolen was not as self-sufficient as Singapore. The area was poor and disease-ridden: the first reports from the committees reflected very poorly upon the condition of the colony. Unlike the salutary neglect Raffles granted upon Singapore, he delayed European-inspired reforms, emphasising only the cultivation of whatever land was available.

Native authorities were given power in their respective districts, and were answerable only to the lieutenant-governor. The slave-debtor system was brought in, instead of the old slavery system that Raffles had abolished in Java, Borneo, and initially in Bencoolen. Slave-debtors were registered, and educational reforms started to focus on children, instead of the entire population. Raffles looked into a long-term plan for the slow reform of Bencoolen.

Unlike many other European adventurers, Raffles did not impose upon the colonised the alien language or culture of the coloniser. In addition to preserving the artifacts, fauna, and flora of his colonies, he also allowed religious freedom, which was especially important as the Malay states were largely Muslim. Christian schools were started by missionaries in all of his colonies.

=== Consolidation of the Eastern Isles ===
Colonel Bannerman's death in Penang in October 1819 brought new opportunities for Raffles to expand his power to also include the other minor British factories and outposts; from Sumatra to Cochin China. He sailed to Calcutta, and as Lord Hastings sought to consolidate all of the small British possessions in the East Indies. During his sojourn, he had the opportunity to argue for free trade, and the protection of the private enterprise. Education and the retention of small British outposts were also discussed.

The Dutch claim on the Sultanate of Johore and hence, Rhio, and the diplomatic exchanges between Baron Godert van der Capellen and Calcutta continued throughout this time. The legitimacy of the British treaties was also questioned once again, but finally, as Singapore grew at an exponential rate, the Dutch gave up their claim on the island, allowing the colony to continue as a British possession. However, the pressures put upon Calcutta ensured that no single governor of all British possessions in the Strait or on Sumatra was appointed, and Raffles, whose health was slowly ailing, returned to Bencoolen.

== Administration of Bencoolen, 1820–1822 ==
Raffles returned to Bencoolen in ill-health, but as his health improved, he continued on his quest to learn about the island he now called home. He studied the Batak cannibals of Tapanuli, and their rituals and laws regarding the consumption of human flesh, writing in detail about the transgressions that warranted such an act, as well as their methods. He also noted the rise of the Sikh religion in certain parts of Sumatra.

By early 1820, Tengku Long had firmly established himself as the Sultan of Johor to the British, but the political situation in the area remained a befuddled mess, with the old sultan dying, and many new ones attempting to gain either the crown or regency. As Farquhar was involving himself poorly in local politics, Raffles appointed Travers as the Resident of Singapore, replacing Farquhar. Upon his arrival, Travers found the colony a delightful smörgåsbord of different races and cultures, numbering over six thousand. He also found that Singapore's trade was slowly overtaking that of Java.

As in Java, Raffles collected samples of local species of plant and animal, as well as describing them in his journals. He located other tribes, and recorded their customs, especially their religions and laws. Bringing the island of Nias under British rule, he noted its civilised state and high production yields of rice.

Yet the production of food remained a problem. In Bencoolen, Raffles paid special attention to the agricultural methods of the Chinese, including an introduction to the only issue of Proceedings of the Agricultural Society. To remedy the shortages, his employer, the East India Company, concerned themselves only with profit-taking. Even as Raffles lived like a country gentleman, and ran his colony like an estate, his expenditure on nature preservation was seriously frowned upon. In both Calcutta and London, they discussed his removal from office, while Castlereagh continued negotiations with the Dutch regarding the ongoing diplomatic conflicts.

Luckily, the Singapore issue had its supporters in the House, so as negotiations continued in Europe, Raffles remained largely idle in Bencoolen. The only major issue, outside the politics of the local sultans, involved the replacement of Farquhar, who decided that he had no intention of leaving his post voluntarily, causing a moment of tension between him and Travers. Raffles's request for Travers to deliver dispatches to India nullified the issue late in the year, and Farquhar remained in charge of Singapore, with its survival still in doubt for many in both India and London, who believed that it would either be handed over to the Dutch, or taken violently by force when Castlereagh's negotiations had ended. Still William Farquhar stirred up more trouble, especially with local English merchants over trivial matters of self-importance, and overreaction over small infractions of white traders, for some of which he was reprimanded by Calcutta officially. Public works, commissioned by Raffles but undertaken by Farquhar, were becoming overwhelmingly expensive.

Personal tragedies also started for Raffles. His eldest son, Leopold Stamford (b. 1819), died during an epidemic on 4 July 1821. The oldest daughter, Charlotte (b. 1818), was also sick with dysentery by the end of the year, but it would be his youngest son, Stamford Marsden (b. 1820), who would perish first with the disease, on 3 January 1822, with Charlotte to follow 10 days later. For the good part of four months, the couple remained devastated. The year would be eventful with the suicide of Castlereagh, and the appointment of Lord Amherst as the governor-general of India, replacing Hastings. As Raffles grew restless and depressed, he decided to visit Singapore before retiring and heading home to England. Accompanying him would be his wife Sophia and their only surviving child, Ella.

Raffles was elected a member of the American Antiquarian Society (AAS) in 1822.

== Singapore (1822–1823) ==
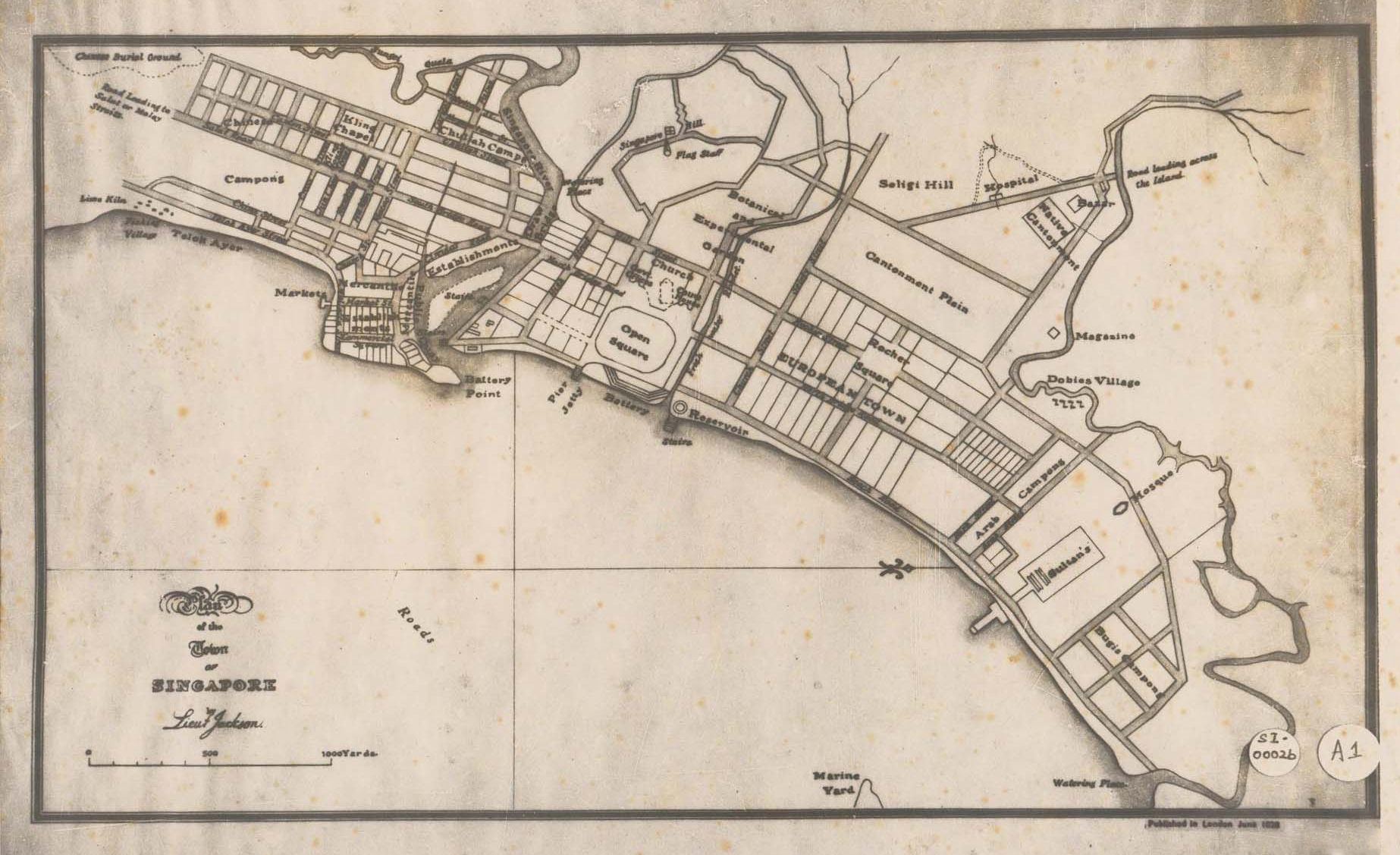
The Plan of the Town of Singapore, also known more commonly as the Jackson Plan or Raffles Town Plan

Raffles returned to Singapore in October 1822. Raffles was pleased with the fact that Singapore had grown exponentially in such a short period of time. The colony was a bustling hub of trade and economic activity. Even so, Farquhar's administration was deemed unsatisfactory, for example, he allowed merchants to encroach on government areas, permitted vices such as gambling, and tolerated slave trade. In response, Raffles instituted new policies, and set up a committee headed by the colony's engineer, Philip Jackson to draw up a plan, now known as the Jackson Plan or Raffles Town Plan, based on instructions by Raffles. The plan was still racially segregated, giving the best land to the Europeans. Yet it was considered remarkably scientific for the time. Raffles also supervised the levelling of a small hill south of Singapore River to create Commercial Square (now Raffles Place).

It was also during the re-planning and reconstruction of the port town that Farquhar dramatically argued with Raffles, who now considered him unfit for the position of Resident. Raffles dismissed Farquhar in April 1823, and took direct control. He had written to Calcutta declaring Farquhar to be incompetent in January 1823, and repeated efforts were made to persuade Calcutta to send a replacement for Farquhar; but they remained unanswered. Raffles made Johor a British protectorate, raising a protest from Van der Capellen. Eventually, Calcutta appointed John Crawfurd, who had followed Raffles for over twenty years, as the new Resident of Singapore, while Captain William Gordon MacKenzie took over Bencoolen. In March 1823, coincidentally the same day he was replaced, he received an official reprimand from London for the takeover of Nias.

Raffles convened a meeting on 1 April 1823, with the intention of opening a Malay college in Singapore, based on his observations on his years in southeast Asia, and his belief of the importance of both the local and the European languages. Raffles personally gave $2,000 towards the effort, the East India Company gave $4,000, with the contributions from various subscribers totalling $17,495. This would be the founding of Raffles Institution.

In the final few weeks of his stay in Singapore, in 1823, Raffles drafted a series of administrative regulations for Singapore that aimed to govern Singapore in a fair manner, but also reflected his stance on various moral and social issues. A registration system was first instituted for all land, regardless of ownership, and the repossession of the land by the government if land remained unregistered. This act asserted the power of the British government as it covered land previously owned by the Sultan as well. This is followed by laws regarding the port and freedom of trade. In May 1823, he outlawed gambling, imposed heavy taxation on what he considered social evils such as drunkenness and opium smoking, and banned slavery. A police force and magistracy were also set up on British principles, turning a trading post into a proper city with some semblance of order. A specific regulation in the constitution called for the multi-ethnic population to remain as they were; and no crimes were entirely based on racial principles. Raffles worked on drafting laws, defining exactly 'what' constituted a criminal act. However, Raffles tolerated the practice of regulated debt-slavery, which gave the appearance of free labour while remaining a cheap option for labour.

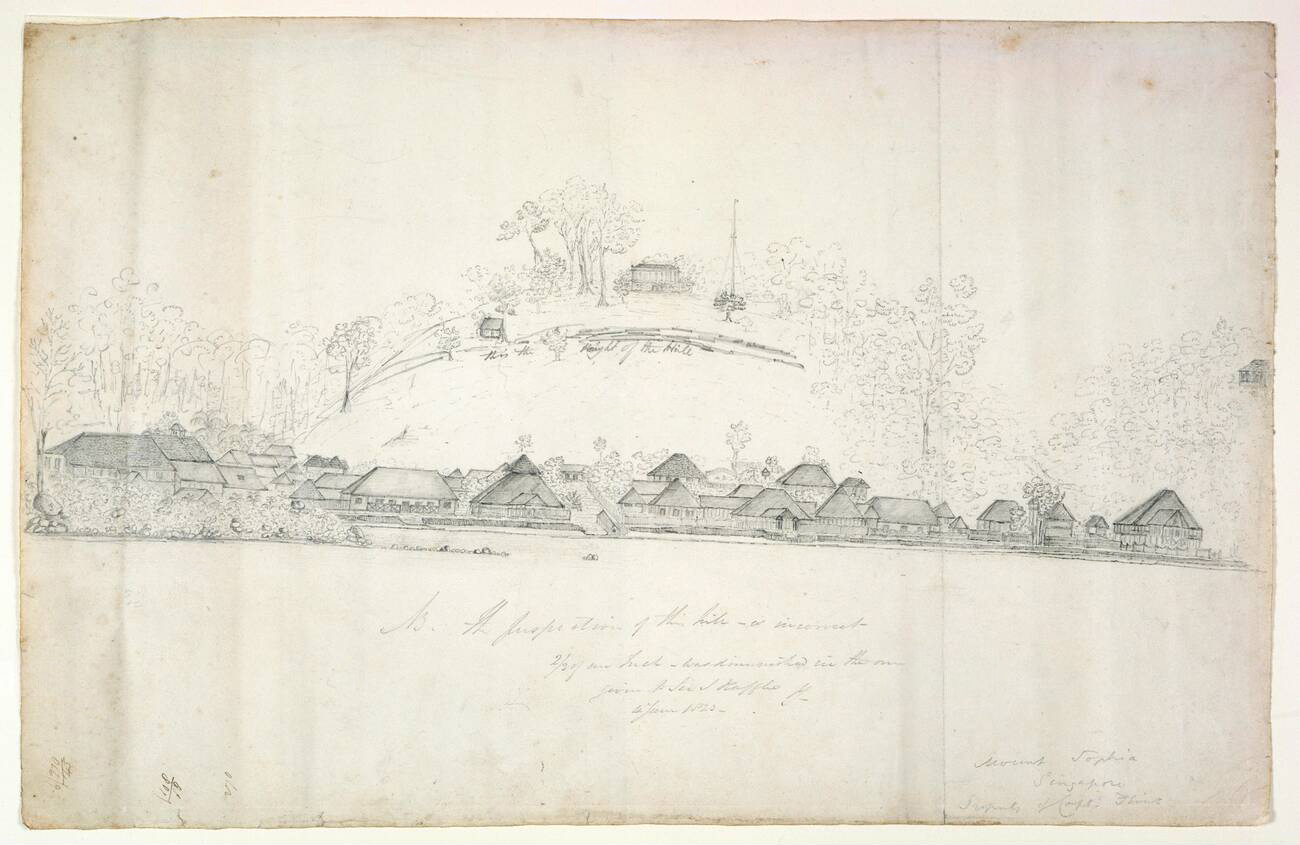
A view of Singapore from the sea, sketched by Lt. Philip Jackson shortly before Raffles's departure in 1823. Found amongst documents belonging to Raffles

Finally, on 9 June 1823, feeling that his work in establishing Singapore was finished, he boarded a ship for home, but not before a stop in Batavia to visit his old home, and adversary, van der Capellen. A final stop in Bencoolen followed. Tragedy befell Raffles once more when his youngest daughter, Flora Nightingall, born on 19 September, died a little over one month later on 28 November while still in Bencoolen.

On 2 February 1824, Raffles and his family embarked on the East Indiaman Fame for England. She caught fire 80 km (50 mi) from Bencoolen the evening after she sailed. All aboard were able to take to her boats and were saved, although the ship herself was totally destroyed. The fire claimed most of his drawings and papers.

The Anglo-Dutch Treaty of 1824 finally settled the score in the East Indies. The British gained dominance in the north, while the entirety of Sumatra became Dutch. The Malay Peninsula and the Indian subcontinent were both free of Dutch interference. Raffles finally returned to England on 22 August 1824, over a year after he left Singapore. His longest tenure in Singapore was only eight months, but he was considered the founder of Singapore nevertheless.

== Return to Britain and death ==
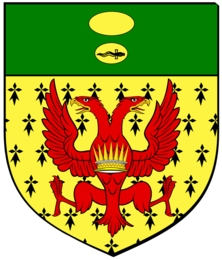
Arms of Stamford Raffles

Upon arrival in England in poor health, Sir Stamford and Lady Raffles convalesced in Cheltenham until September 1824, after which he entertained distinguished guests in both London and his home. He also made plans to stand for parliament, but this ambition was never realised. They moved to a London address at Berners Street at the end of November 1824, just in time to have a war of words with Farquhar, who had also arrived in the city, in front of the Court of Directors of the East India Company regarding Singapore. Despite raising several severe charges against Raffles, Farquhar was ultimately unable to discredit him; he was denied a chance to be restored to Singapore, but was given a military promotion instead.

With the Singapore matter settled, Raffles turned to his other great interests: botany and zoology. He was elected a member of the Linnean Society of London on 5 February 1825. Raffles was a founder (in 1825) and first president (elected April 1826) of the Zoological Society of London (ZSL) and the London Zoo.

Meanwhile, he was not only not granted a pension, but was called to pay over £22,000 sterling for losses incurred during his administration. Raffles replied by clarifying his actions: and he decided to move to his country estate, Highwood, North London, but before the issue was resolved, he was already much too ill.

He died of apoplexy at Highwood House in Mill Hill, north London, on his 45th birthday, 5 July 1826. The most likely underlying cause of death is that of a dural arteriovenous fistula. His estate amounted to around £10,000 sterling, which was paid to the company to cover his outstanding debt. Because of his anti-slavery position, he was refused burial inside the local parish church (St Mary's Church, Hendon) by the vicar, Theodor Williams, whose family had made its money in Jamaica in the slave trade. A brass tablet was finally placed in 1887, but the actual whereabouts of his body was not known until 1914, when it was found in a vault. When the church was extended in the 1920s, his tomb was incorporated into the body of the building, and a square floor tablet with inscription marked the spot.

Raffles was survived by his second wife Sophia Hull and daughter Ella, and predeceased by his other four children in Bencoolen.

Ella died in 1840, aged nineteen. Sophia remained at Highwood House until her death in 1858, at the age of 72. Her tomb and memorial may be seen in St Paul's Church graveyard, Mill Hill, close to the rear door of the church. All his other children remained buried overseas. Thirty-three years after his death, Raffles' substantial collection of Indonesian antiquities and ethnography was donated to the British Museum by his nephew, Rev William Charles Raffles Flint.

== Memorial sculpture in Westminster Abbey, London ==
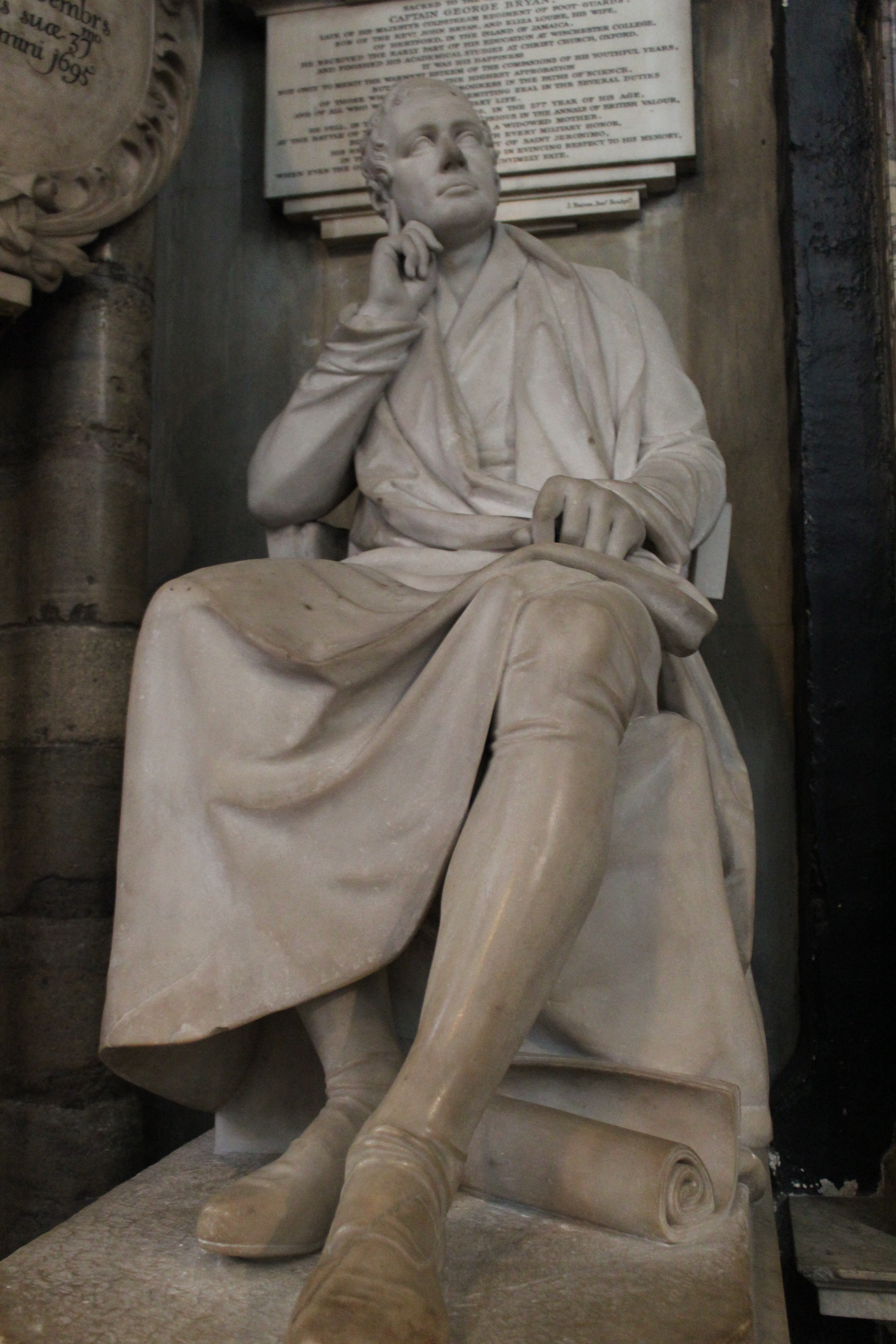
Raffles statue in Westminster Abbey

A life-size figure in white marble by Sir Francis Chantrey depicts Raffles in a seated position in Westminster Abbey, London, England. The sculpture was completed in 1832, and it is in the north choir aisle.

The inscription reads:

To the memory of Sir Thomas Stamford Raffles, L.L.D. F.R.S. Lieut. Governor of Java and first President of the Zoological Society of London. Born 1781 Died 1826. Selected at an early age to conduct the government of the British conquests in the Indian ocean, by wisdom, vigour, and philanthropy, he raised Java to happiness and prosperity unknown under former rulers. After the surrender of that island to the Dutch, and during his government in Sumatra he founded an emporium at Singapore, where in establishing freedom of person as the right of the soil, and freedom of trade as the right of the port, he secured to the British flag the maritime superiority of the eastern seas. Ardently attached to science, he laboured successfully to add to the knowledge and enrich the museums of his native land, in promoting the welfare of the people committed to his charge, he sought the good of his country, and the glory of God.

== Legacy ==
In Singapore, and in other parts of the world, his name lives on in numerous entities, including:

=== Natural history ===
- Raffles gave the scientific name to Macaca fascicularis, also known as the crab-eating macaque.
- He also gave the scientific name of the lesser mouse-deer (Tragulus kanchil).

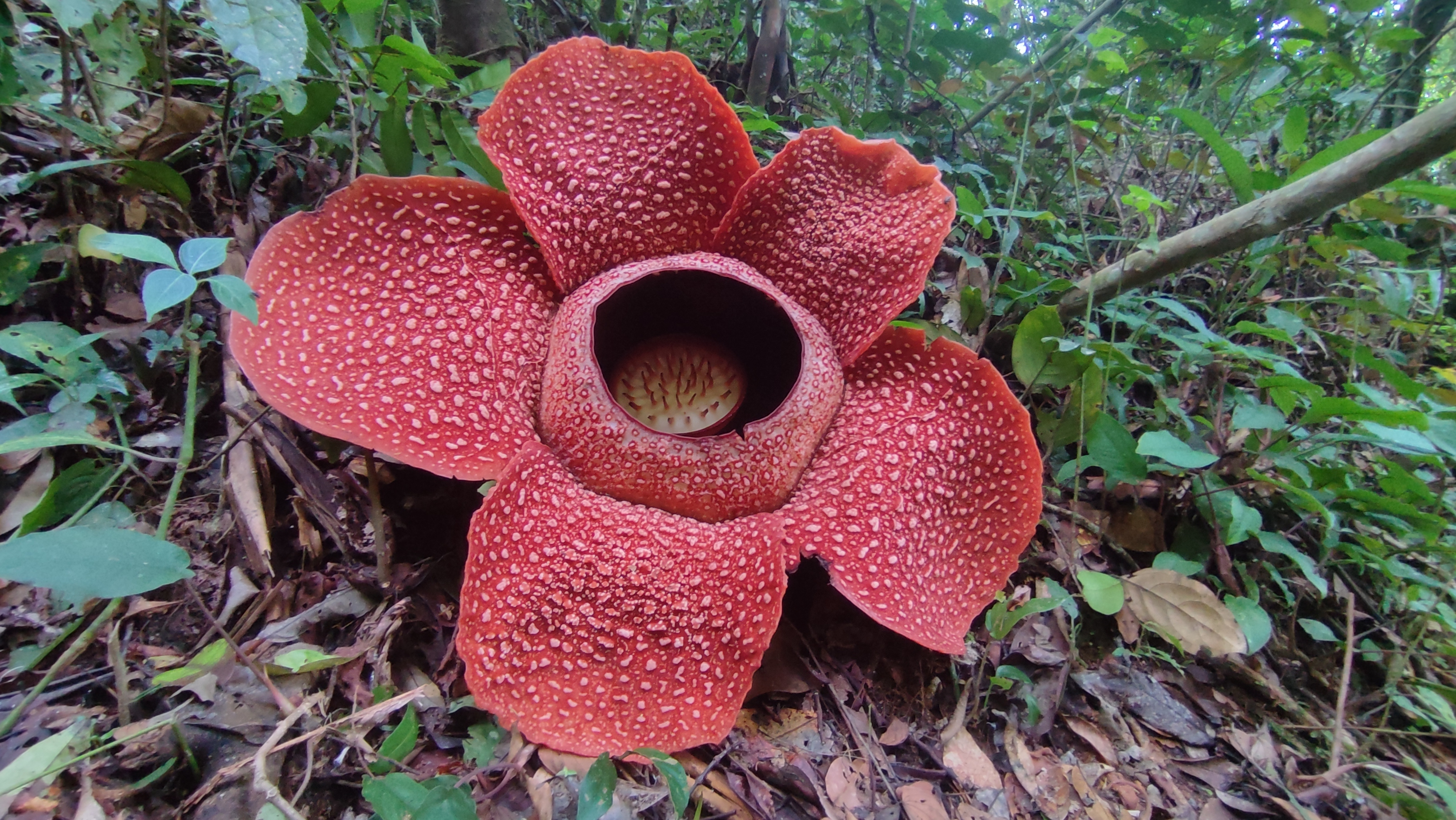
Rafflesia arnoldii from Indonesia.

A number of species are named after him:

- Chaetodon rafflesii, latticed butterflyfish
- Dinopium rafflesii, olive-backed woodpecker
- Megalaima rafflesi, red-crowned barbet
- Nepenthes rafflesiana, a species of pitcher plant
- Protanilla rafflesi Taylor, 1990, a species of ant
- Rafflesia, a genus of parasitic flowering plants, known for having the largest flowers in the world
- Theridion rafflesi Simon, 1899, spider from Sumatra

While in Sumatra Raffles commissioned artists to make drawings of his collections of animals and plants. The surviving drawings are held by the British Library.

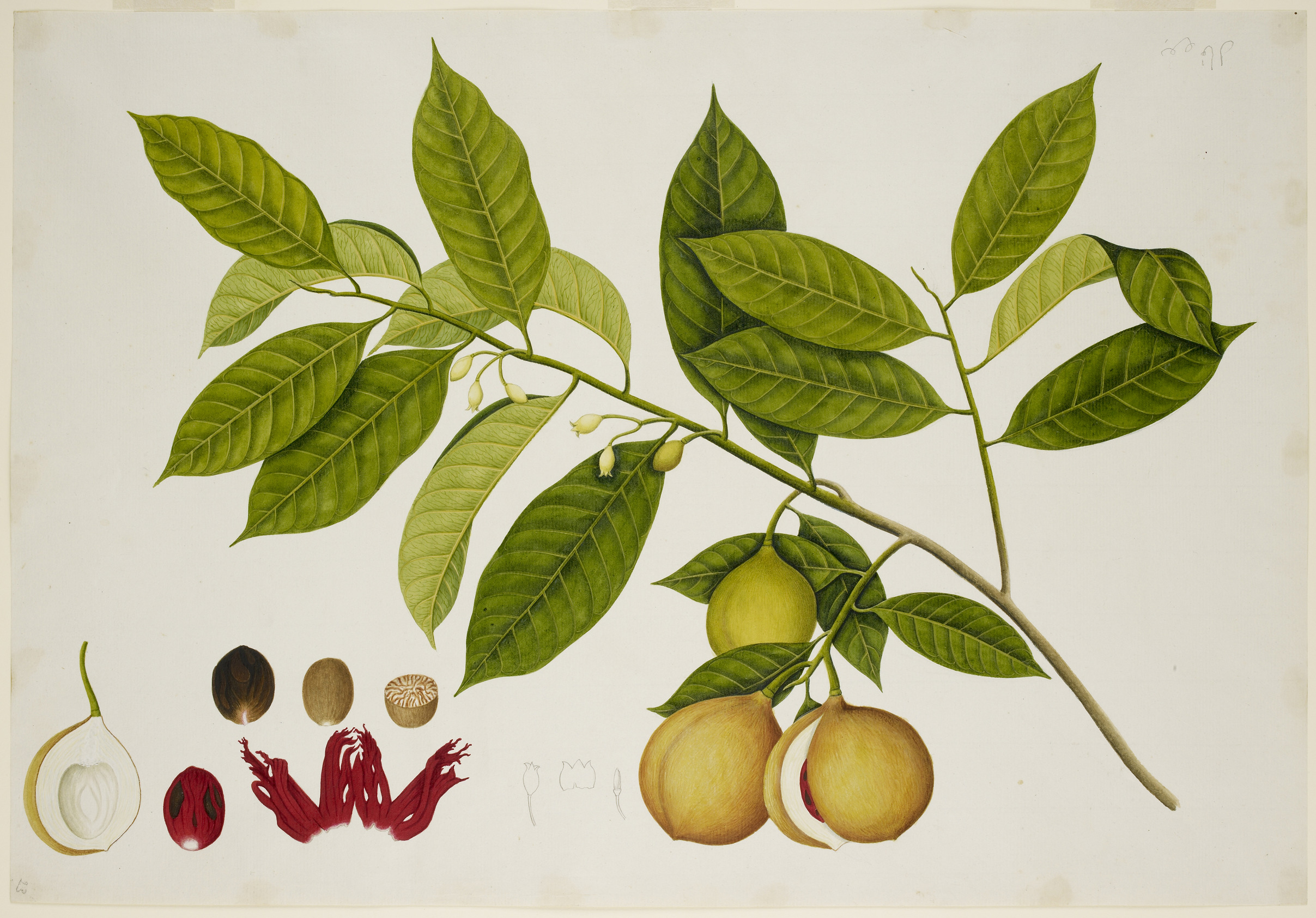
Fragrant nutmeg (Myristica fragrans)

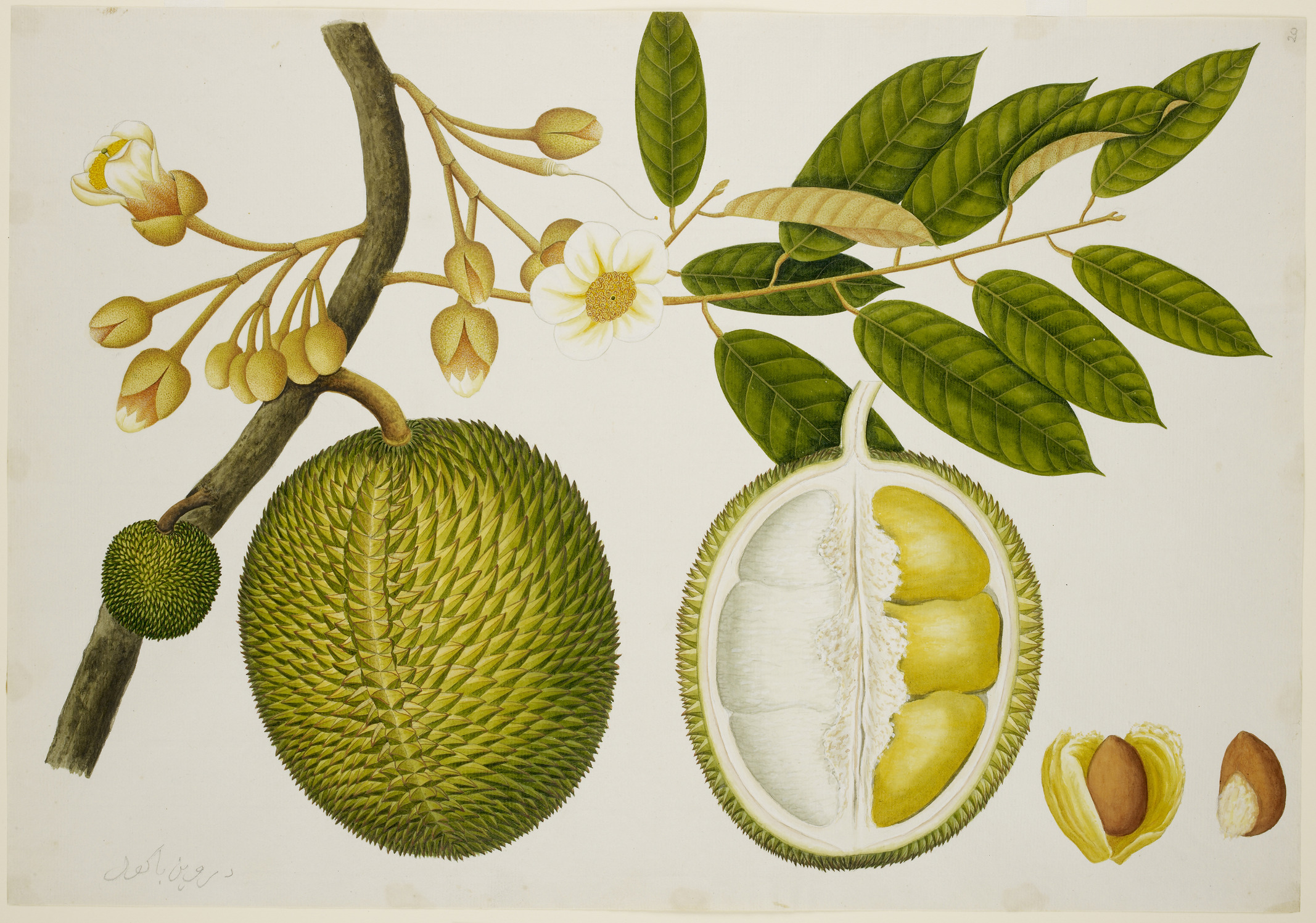
Durian (Durio zibethinus)

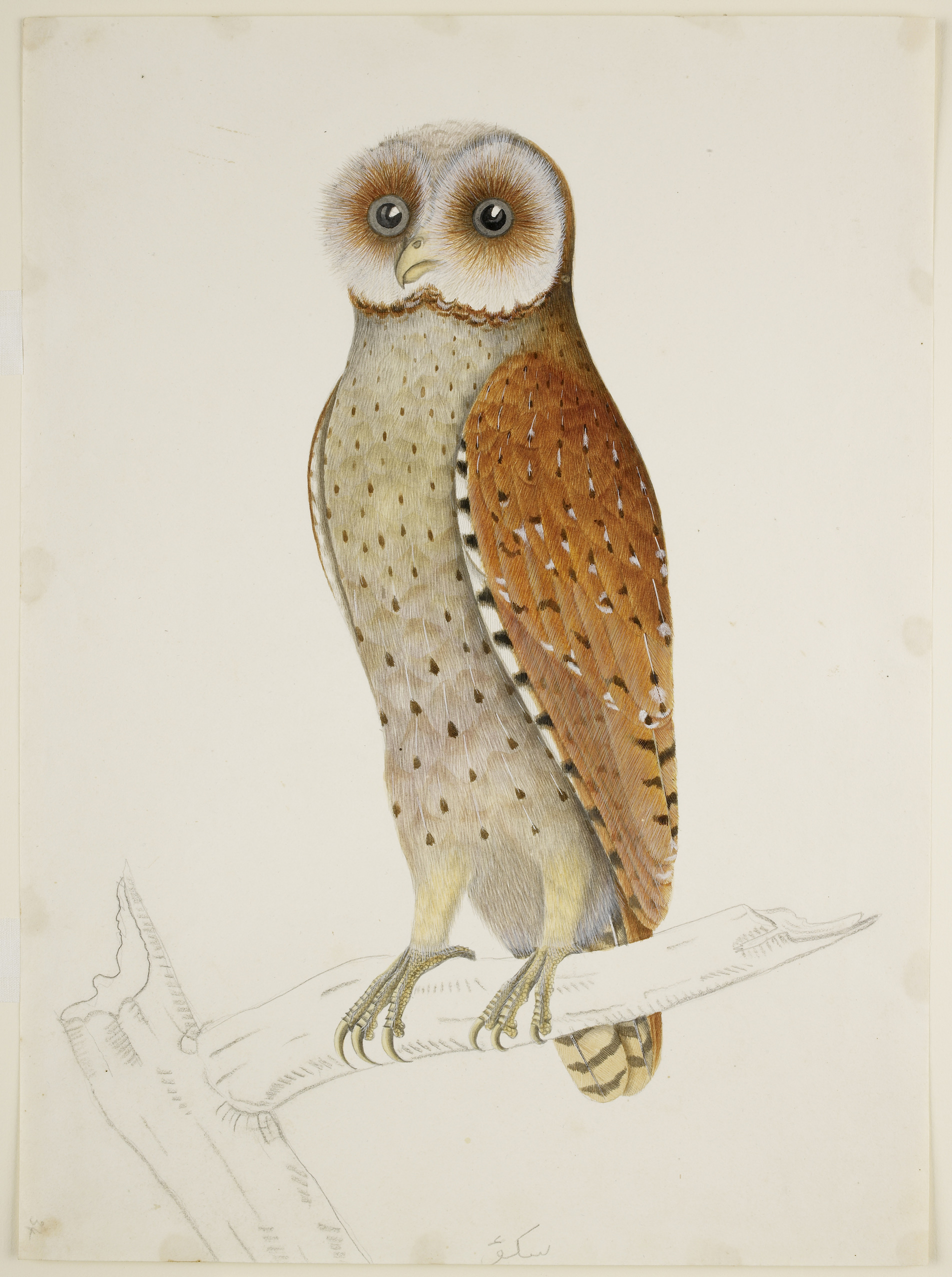
Oriental bay owl (Phodilus badius)

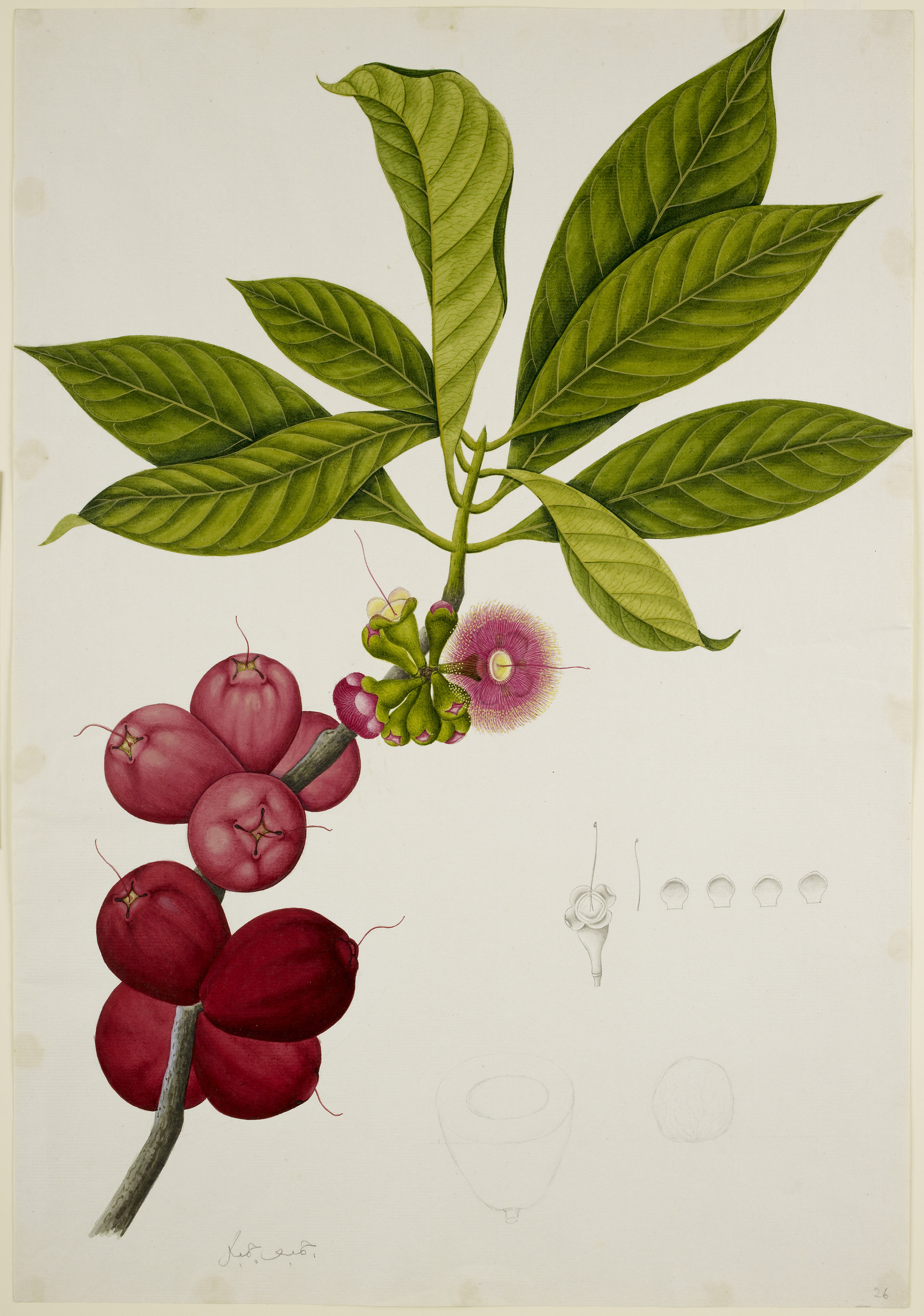
Malay apple (Syzygium malaccense)

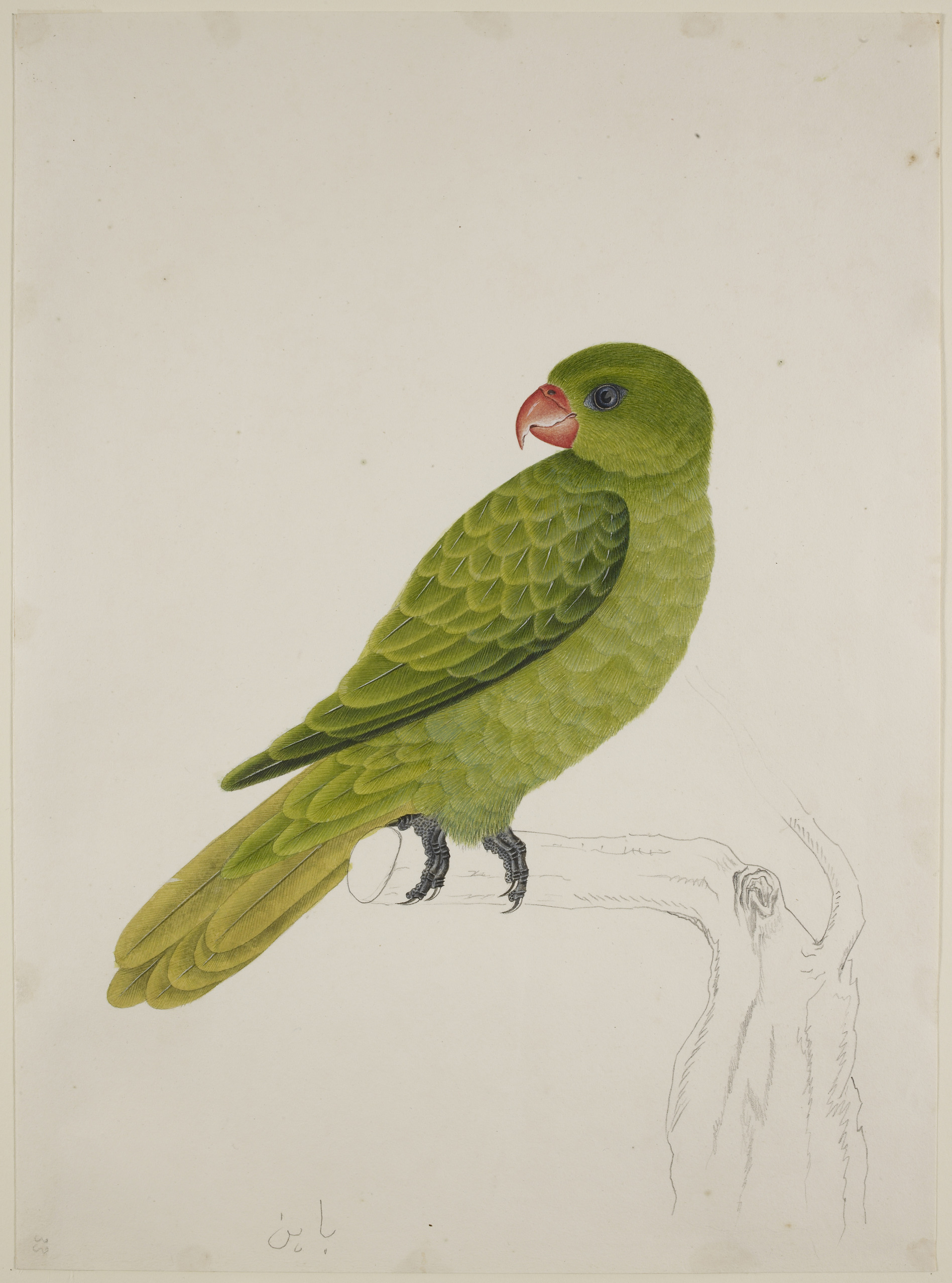
Blue-backed parrot (Tanygnathus everetti)

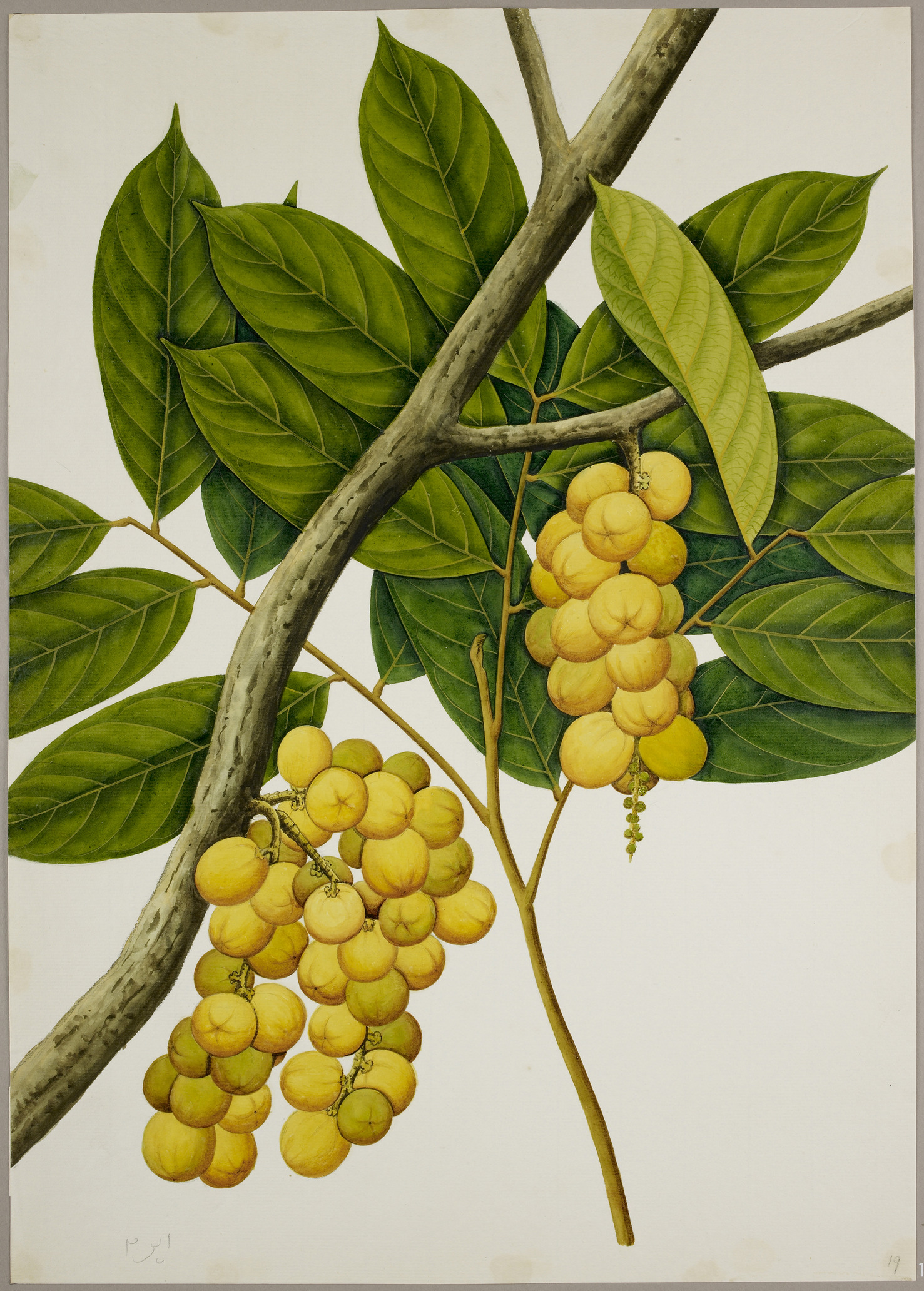
Langsat (Lansium parasiticum)

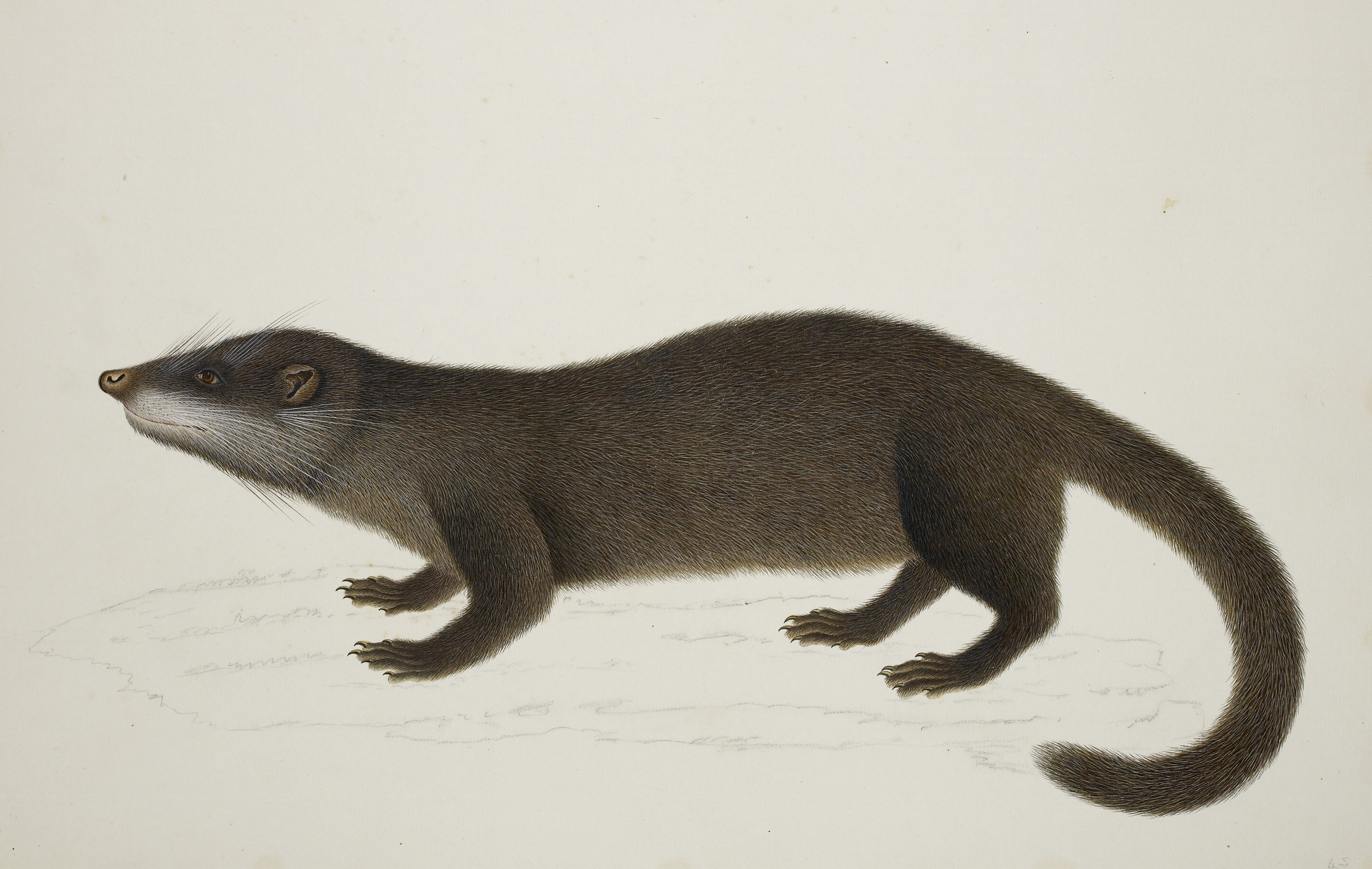
Otter civet (Cynogale bennettii)

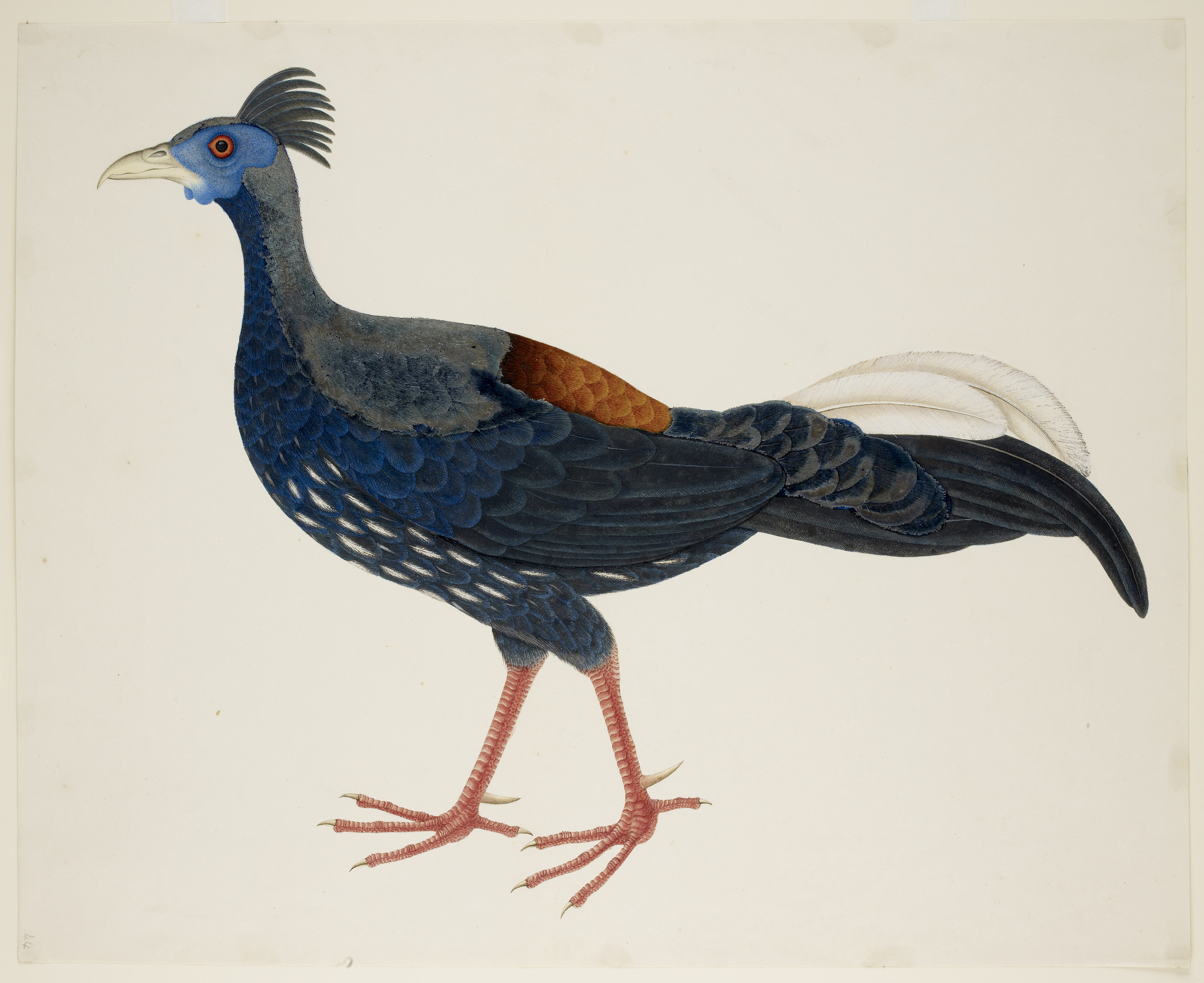
Crested fireback (Lophura ignita)

Most natural history specimens collected by Raffles were lost with the sinking of Fame. A few sent earlier, and some collected later, survive at the Natural History Museum, London and World Museum.

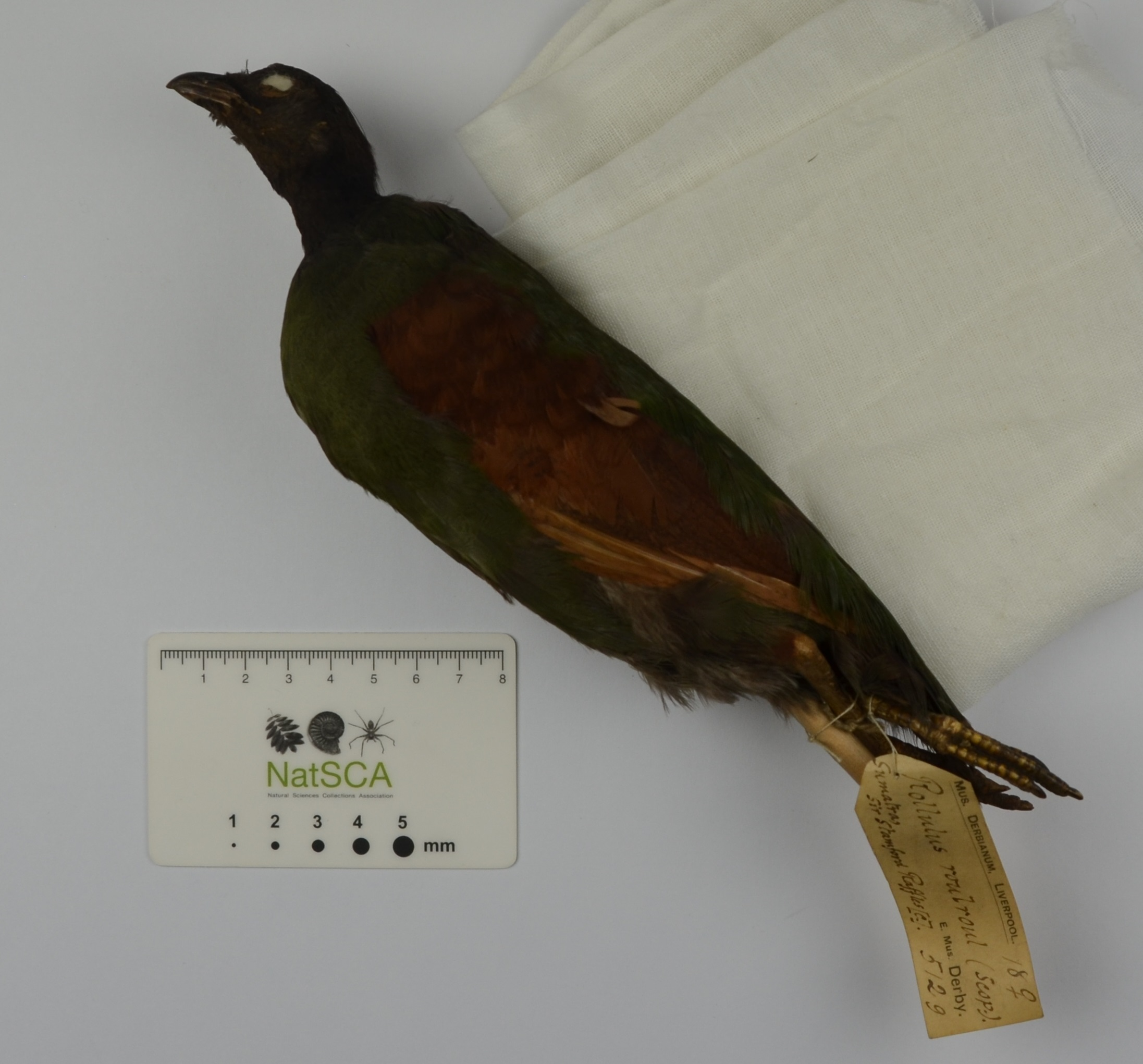
Ferruginous Partridge NML-VZ D512g collected in Sumatra by Stamford Raffles, held at World Museum.

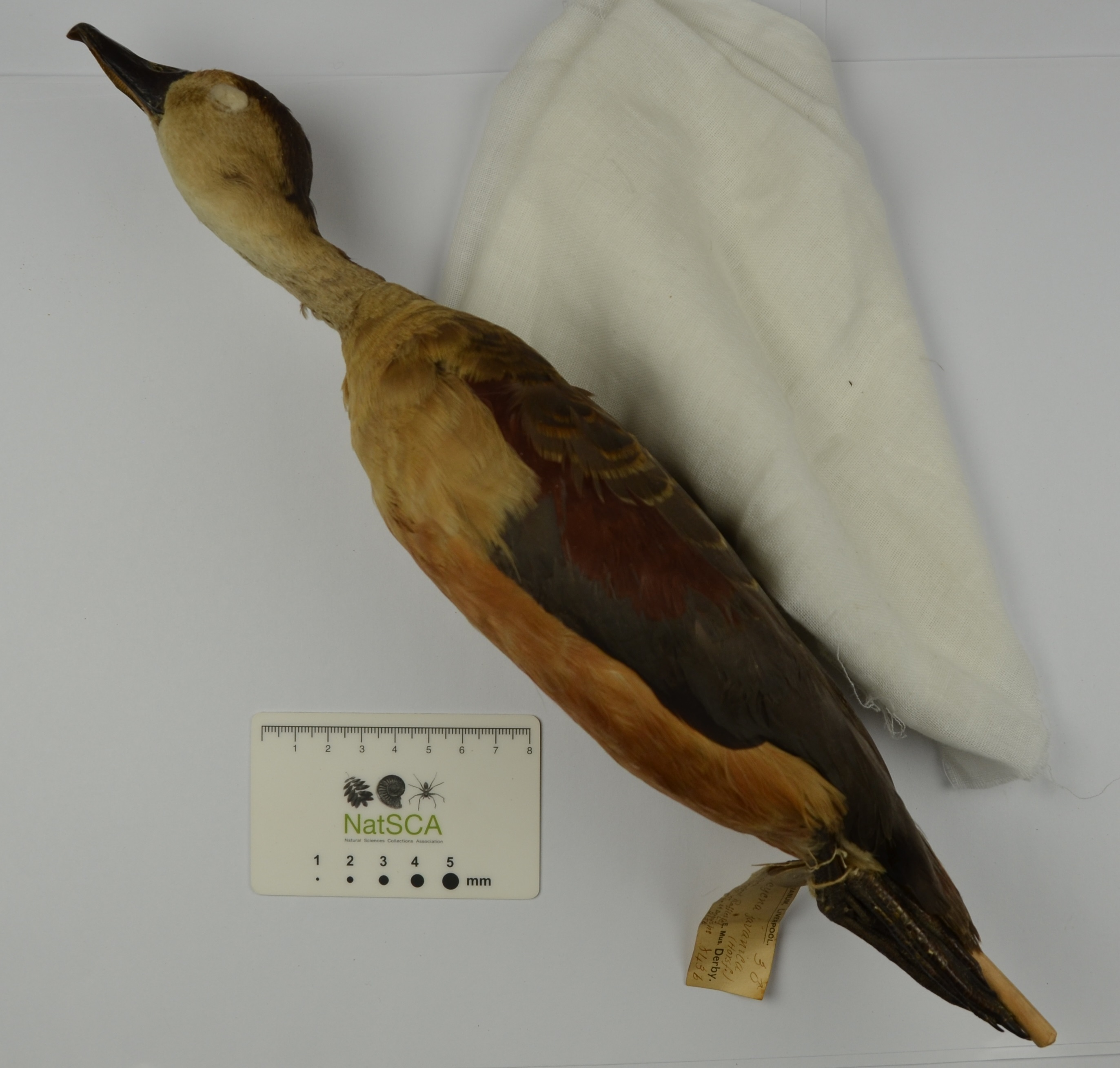
Lesser Whistling Duck NML-VZ D843b collected in Sumatra by Stamford Raffles held in World Museum.

=== Places and landmarks ===
- Raffles City
- Raffles Hospital
- Raffles Hotel
- Raffles Museum of Biodiversity Research - currently Lee Kong Chian Natural History Museum
- Raffles Place

=== Business ===
- Raffles Holdings
- Raffles Medical Group
- Yantai Raffles Shipyard

=== Education ===
- Raffles College – currently National University of Singapore (NUS)
- Raffles Girls' Primary School
- Raffles Girls' School (Secondary)
- Raffles Institution (Secondary and Junior College)
- Stamford Primary School, formerly Stamford Girls' School
- Stamford American International School

=== Sports and recreation ===
- Raffles Cup

=== Sculptures and statues ===
There are also three public statues of Raffles in Singapore, one made of white polymarble along the Singapore River, another made of bronze in front of the Victoria Theatre and Concert Hall and a contemporary bronze sculpture installed at Fort Canning Park.

=== Transport ===
- Raffles Institution Lane
- Raffles Lighthouse
- Raffles Place MRT station
- Stamford Road
- Raffles Class – The former name for Singapore Airlines (SIA)'s business class service

=== Novels ===
Author S. C. George wrote Bright moon in the forest in 1946, a novel based on Raffles' life, and follows him from his birth to his death.

== See also ==
- History of Singapore
- Raffles's Landing Site

== Sources ==
- Barley, Nigel (1999). The Golden Sword: Stamford Raffles and the East. London, England: British Museum Press. ISBN 0-7141-2542-3.
- Barley, Nigel (2009). In the Footsteps of Stamford Raffles. Singapore: Monsoon Publishing. ISBN 978-981-08-3534-7.
- Borschberg, Peter (2019). "Dutch objections to British Singapore, 1819–1824: law, politics, commerce and a diplomatic misstep". Journal of Southeast Asian Studies. 50 (4): 540–561. doi:10.1017/S0022463420000053. S2CID 226792993.
- Brayley, E. W. (1827). "Some account of the life and writings and contributions to science, of the late Sir Thomas Stamford Raffles, Knt., F.R.S., S.A. & L.S., &c; successively Lieutenant-Governor of Java and its dependencies, and of Fort Marlborough, Singapore, and the British Possessions in Sumatra: Founder and President of the Zoological Society". The Zoological Journal. 3 (9): 1–48.
- Brayley, E. W. (1827). "Some account of the life and writings and contributions to science, of the late Sir Thomas Stamford Raffles, Knt., F.R.S., S.A. & L.S., &c; successively Lieutenant-Governor of Java and its dependencies, and of Fort Marlborough, Singapore, and the British Possessions in Sumatra: Founder and President of the Zoological Society". The Zoological Journal. 3 (11): 382–400.
- Chandler, David P.; Steinberg, David J. (1988). In Search of Southeast Asia. Hawaii: University of Hawaii Press. ISBN 978-0-8248-1110-5.
- Wurtzburg, Charles E. (1986). Raffles of the Eastern Isles. Oxford University Press. ISBN 0-19-582605-1.
- de Jong, Joop (2000). De Waaier van het Fortuin. SDU publishers. ISBN 90-12-08974-3.
- Glendinning, Victoria (2012). Raffles and the Golden Opportunity. Profile Books. ISBN 978-1846686030.
- Murdoch, Adrian, ed. (2013). Raffles – Three Lives. Rott Publishing.
- Noltie, H. J. (2009). Raffles' Ark Redrawn: Natural History Drawings from the Collections of Sir Thomas Stamford Raffles. London, England: British Library Publishing. ISBN 978-0-7123-5084-6.
- Finlayson, George; Raffles, Sir Thomas Stamford, F.R.S. (27 April 2014) [1826]. The Mission to Siam, and Hué the Capital of Cochin China, in the Years 1821-2 (txt). Fairbanks: Project Gutenberg Literary Archive Foundation. EBook #45505.

Political offices
Preceded by Robert Rollo Gillespie	Lieutenant-Governor of the Dutch East Indies; 1811–1816	Succeeded by John Fendall
Preceded by George John Siddons as Resident of Bencoolen	Lieutenant-Governor of Bencoolen; 1818–1824	Succeeded by John Prince as Resident of Bencoolen
