= Governors of Bencoolen =

This is a list of governors, deputy governors, residents, and lieutenant-governors of the presidency and residency versions of British Bencoolen.

== List ==
=== Deputy governors ===
Subordinated to Madras Presidency

- 1685: Ralph Ord
- 1685 – 1690: Benjamin Bloom
- 1690 – 1691: James Sowdon
- 1691 – 1695: Charles Fleetwood
- 1695 – 1696: Charles Barwell
- 1696 – 1699: Matthew Mildmay
- 1699 – 1700: Robert Broughton
- 1700 – 17 Dec 1705: Richard Watts
- 1705 – 1708: Matthew Ridley
- 1708: James Cross
- 1708: Abraham Hoyle
- 1708: John Delapie
- 1708 – 1710: Robert Skingle
- 1710: Jeremiah Harrison (Supervisor)
- 1710 – 1711: Anthony Ettricke
- 1711 – 1712: John Daniell
- 1712 John Hunter
- 1712 – 1716: Joseph Collett - On 1 September 1712, Collett arrived at York Fort in Bencoolen in Sumatra and was subsequently appointed Governor.
- 1716 – 1717: Theophilus Shyllinge
- 1717 – 1718: Richard Farmer
- 1718 – 1719: Thomas Cooke (Supervisor)
- 1719 – 1723: Isaac Pyke
- 1723: Thomas Dunster
- 1723 – 1728: Joseph Walsh
- 1728 – 1730: Nicholas Morse
- 1730 – 1731: Stephen Newcome
- 1731 – 1736: Francis Everest
- 1736 – 1746: Robert Lennox
- 1746 – 1752: Joseph Hurlock
- 1752 – 1754: Robert Hindley
- 1754 – 1755: John Walsh (Supervisor)
- 1755: John Pybus
- 1755 – 1756: Thomas Combes
- 1757 – 1758: Randolph Marriott
- 1758 – 2 April 1760: Roger Carter
- 2 Apr 1760 – 1760: Charles Henri Hector d'Estaing (French Commander)

=== Governors of Bencoolen Presidency ===
- Feb 1762 – Jul 1762: Samuel Ardley (acting)
- 1760 – 1767: Roger Carter
- 1767 – 1776: Richard Wyatt
- 1776: Robert Hay
- 1776 – 1780: William Broff
- 1780 – 1781: Hew Steuart
- 1781 – 1785: Edward Coles

In 1785, Bencoolen became a Residency, within the Bengal Presidency

=== Deputy governors of Bencoolen ===
- 1785 – 1786: John Crisp (1st time)
- 1786 – 1787: Thomas Palmer
- 1787 – 1789: George Salmon (Supervisor)
- 1789 – 1793: John Crisp (2nd time)
- 1793 – 1799: Robert Broff
- 1799: John Crisp (3rd time)
- 1799 – 1800: Philip Braham (acting)
- 1800 – 1805: Walter Ewer

=== Residents of Bencoolen ===
- April 1805 – 23 December 1807: Thomas Parr
- 1808 – 1810: Richard Parry
- 1810 – 1812: William Parker
- 1812 – 22 Mar 1818: George John Siddons

=== Lieutenant-Governor of Bencoolen ===
- 1818 – 1824: Stamford Raffles - who enacted major reforms, including the abolishment of slavery, as well as founding of Singapore.

=== Resident of Bencoolen ===
- 1824 – 1 Mar 1825: John Prince
