= Bill Travis =

Bill Travis (born 1957) is an American photographer known for his atmospheric landscapes and experimentation with alternative photographic techniques. Travis explains that his "work is... an inquiry into time."

His discovery of photography came through art history—he earned a Ph.D. in medieval art and taught at the university level for several years—and this background has influenced his creative work. From 1995 to 2002, his photography of medieval sculpture and architecture appeared in prestigious journals, ranging from Arte medievale (Italy) to Artibus et Historiae (Poland), Gazette des Beaux-Arts (France), Konsthistorisk Tidskrift (Sweden), and Zeitschrift für Kunstgeschichte (Germany).

Beginning in 2003, he expanded his subject matter to the human figure and took to experimenting with photographic transfers on gilt boards, using a technique of his invention that let the gold shine through to the surface. The result is something close in spirit to the Byzantine icon. More recently, Travis has developed other techniques that explore the frontier between painting and photography, such as transfers on mirror, glass, mother of pearl, and tinfoil. The cities he has photographed most extensively are New York, Paris, Rome, Venice, Lisbon, and Prague. For the past several years, he has photographed parks, gardens, and other sites of historic significance, including Versailles, Sanssouci, Hadrian's Villa, and Central Park. Since 2009, he has also worked on various photo-based artist books and scrolls.

A New York-based photographer, Travis has shown his work at museums, universities, public venues, and commercial galleries in New York City, Washington, DC, Los Angeles, San Francisco, Atlanta, Palm Beach, Paris, Berlin, Madrid, Rome, Castel Gandolfo, Mexico City, Buenos Aires, São Paulo, Lima, and Montevideo. He was interviewed for Italian television on RomaUno in June 2005 and has lectured on his art at Columbia University. His works belong to several public and private collections around the world. Portfolios in print media include Pref (2009), David Leddick's The Nude Male: 21st Century Visions (2008), Gab (2008) and Mein schwules Auge 3 (2006). Brian Paul Clamp, author of an essay in Travis’s recent monograph, Along the Appian Way (2007), writes of an “otherworld [in this body of work] where the real and the imaginary intersect.” A second monograph, Parks and Gardens in Lazio: A Meditation, appeared in 2008. Writing in the exhibition catalogue to the show in Castelgandolfo, Stefano Abbadessa Mercanti finds in his art “an unusual character that recalls the great works of the past, while also addressing contemporary issues.”

Images can be seen on his website, www.billtravisphoto.com

== General references ==
Pref, February 2009. (two pages)

David Leddick, The Nude Male: 21st Century Visions, New York: Universe, 2008. (portfolio)

Bill Travis, Parks and Gardens in Lazio: A Meditation, Grottaferrata (Italy): Mercanti, 2008. (monograph with 50 full-color illustrations)

“Romantik verspricht mehr: Unter Wasser mit Bill Travis,” Gab Magazin, February 2008, pp. 24–25. (portfolio)

Krystyna Lemanowicz, Z miloscia ku swiatlu Pila (Poland), 2007. (sample photographs, including bookcover)

Bill Travis, Along the Appian Way, with an essay by Brian Paul Clamp, Grottaferrata (Italy): Mercanti, 2007. (monograph with 51 full-color illustrations)

Rinaldo Hopf and Axel Shock, Mein schwules Auge 3, Tübingen (Germany), 2006. (portfolio)

The Intimate Portrait/Ritratto Intimo: Bill Travis, Chiara Abbaticchio, exh. cat., Grottaferrata (Italy), 2005. (two-person show)

== Public collections ==
Cabinet des Estampes, Bibliothèque Nationale, Paris.

Société française de photographie, Paris.

Dumbarton Oaks (Harvard University), Washington, DC.

Yale University, New Haven, CT.

Portuguese Center of Photography, Porto.

Photography Collection, New York Public Library.

Kiyosato Museum of Photographic Arts, Hokuto (Japan).

Museo de la Fotografía, Rafaela (Argentina).

Schwules Museum, Berlin.

The Kinsey Institute, Indiana University, Bloomington.

New York University, New York City.

Lincoln Center for the Performing Arts, New York City (Dance Collection).
