= John Fendall =

British colonial official (1762–1825)

The Honourable John Fendall
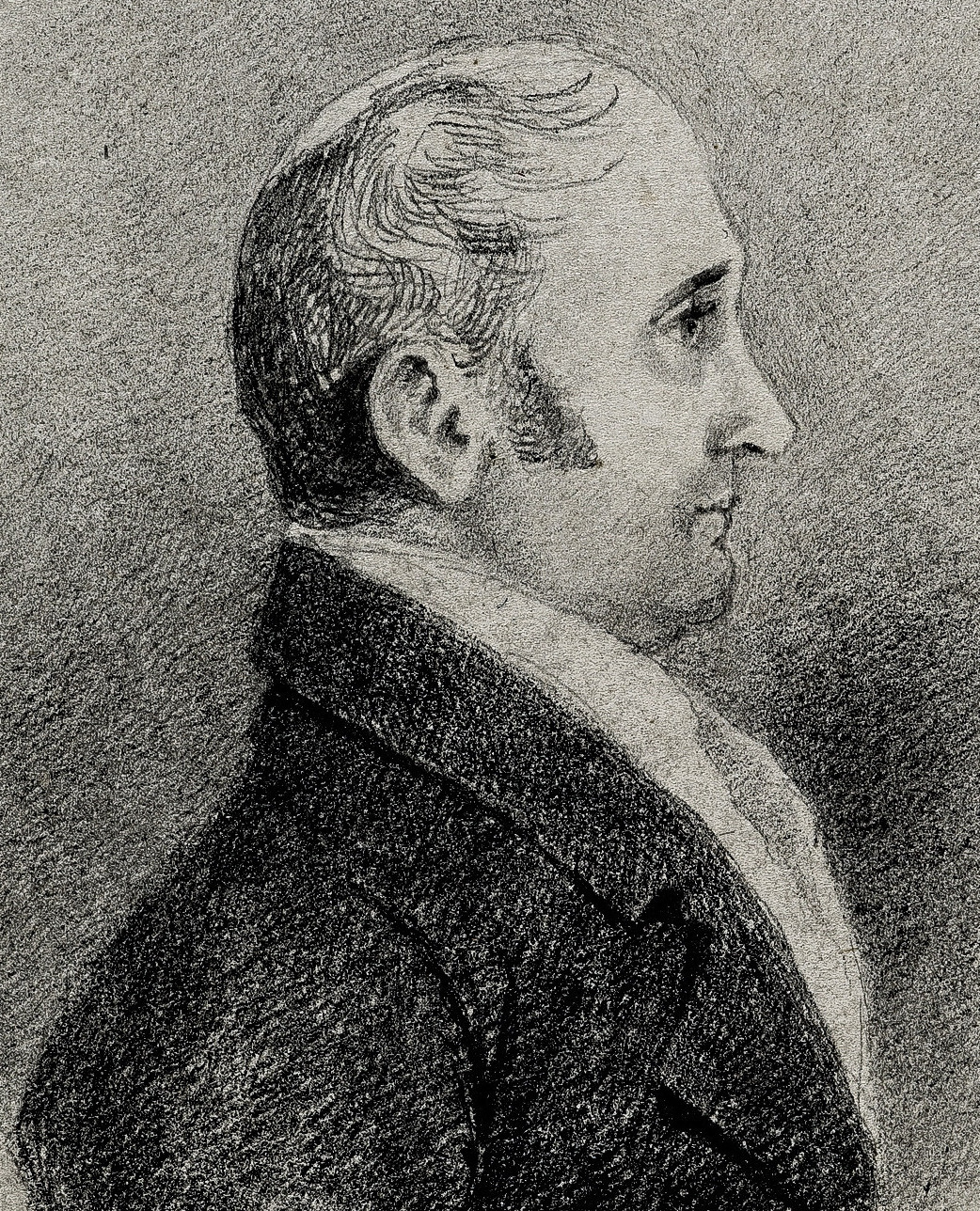
- John Fendall, c. 1812–1820

British Lieutenant-Governor of the Dutch East Indies
- In office 12 March 1816 – 19 August 1816
- Appointed by: Marquess of Hastings
- Monarch: George III
- Preceded by: Stamford Raffles
- Succeeded by: Position abolished; (Godert van der Capellen, Cornelis Theodorus Elout, Arnold Adriaan Buyskes as Commissioners-General)

Personal details
- Born: 9 October 1762 London, England
- Died: 10 November 1825 (aged 63) Calcutta, British India
- Resting place: South Park Street Cemetery
- Spouses: Mary Farquharson (m. 1790; died 1818) Harriet Halcott (m. 1820)
- Children: 8 children

John Fendall (9 October 1762 – 10 November 1825) was a colonial official in the British East India Company, a member of the Supreme Council of Bengal, and the last British governor of Java.

== Early life and service in East India Company ==
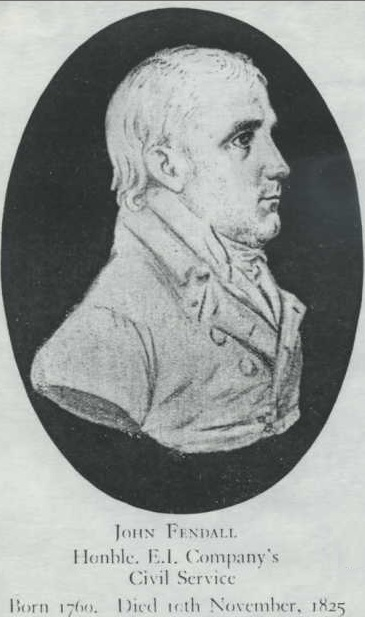
An illustration of Fendall

Fendall was born on 9 October 1762 in St Andrew Holborn, London. He began service in the East India Company in 1778 at the age of 16, before becoming First Assistant to the Collector of Murshidabad, Sir John D’Oyly. In 1788 he became Acting Magistrate of Murshidabad, and in 1790, Acting Collector for the East India Company in the Murshidabad district.

In 1790 he had become Collector of Midnapur and had attained the status of Senior Merchant. He returned to London in 1809 for the first time in 31 years. The voyage at that time took 5 ½ months to complete.

== Governor of Java ==
Fendall returned to Calcutta in 1815 and was informed he had been appointed Lieutenant-Governor of Java, an island the British acquired following the Invasion of Java in 1811. On 12 March 1816 by the last advice from Batavia, John relieved a sickly Sir Stamford Raffles as Lieutenant-Governor of Java, an island which is now a part of the Republic of Indonesia. Upon his arrival, Fendall was faced with significant administrative arrears and a treasury that was almost depleted, challenges he began to address immediately. Fendall ensured that the ailing Raffles continued to receive the courtesies due to the position of Lieutenant-Governor. Thomas Otho Travers, an aide-de-camp to Raffles, noted Fendall’s character, describing him as ‘a man … of a mild, placid temper, gentle, easy and unassuming in his manner, with a sound mind and understanding’.

=== Sovereignty dispute over Banjarmasin ===
In the process of transferring Java back to Dutch control, Fendall faced diplomatic challenges, notably regarding the status of Banjarmasin in Borneo. Fendall encountered a paradoxical situation with conflicting stipulations of the Anglo-Dutch Treaty of 1814 and a separate 1812 treaty between the East India Company and the Sultan of Banjarmasin. The 1814 treaty mandated the transfer of Banjarmasin to Dutch control, while the 1812 treaty explicitly forbade its transfer to any other European power.

Faced with the limitations of slow communication and the absence of situation-specific guidance from the British government, Fendall endeavoured to buy time. He aimed to convince the Dutch that their claim to Banjarmasin was baseless, asserting the territory had been deserted by the Dutch, and was therefore exempt from the terms of the 1814 treaty.

Fendall leveraged historical records from Java, showing Marshal Herman Willem Daendels’ complete withdrawal from southern Borneo in 1809 and his relinquishment of Dutch claims there. He identified that Banjarmasin was not included among the territories ceded to the British in 1811 by General Jan Willem Janssens, but was instead acquired following the Dutch desertion. While the Dutch dismissed these points, arguing Daendels’ withdrawal was a military act without governmental authority, Fendall asserted that any overreach by Daendels was a matter for the Dutch government, not the British. This stance, asserting the finality of Daendels’ actions and their recognition by the Sultan of Banjarmasin, significantly weakened the Dutch negotiating position. Consequently, the Dutch Commissioners-General abandoned this argument, yet they persisted in their demand that Banjarmasin was returned to them without delay, in accordance with the 1814 treaty. This unwavering stance from both sides led to an impasse.

The British proceeded to restore sovereignty of the territory to the Sultan in November 1816. In January 1817, the Sultan signed a separate contract with the Netherlands, affording the Dutch sovereignty over Banjarmasin.

=== Cessation of British rule in Java ===
In 1816, the Dutch sent a fleet to reclaim possession of Java. However, Fendall had not received orders from the Governor-General, and therefore, stoutly refused to give up possession, and the Dutch had to wait until the orders came. On 19 August, of the same year, the Dutch resumed possession, thus making Fendall the last British Lieutenant-Governor of the island. Fendall left Java in June 1818, on the ship Caesar, with the Dutch according him all honours on departure.

== Later career, dispute, and Supreme Council appointment ==
Fendall returned to Calcutta in 1818 and took his seat on the Bench of the Sadr Diwani Adalat (the predecessor of the High Court), becoming Chief Judge in 1819. An area nearby this courthouse (adaulat) was later named Findalbagh, derivative from Fendall.

=== Dispute with Colonel Yule ===
During his tenure in Java, Fendall appears to have disapproved a financial claim made by a certain Colonel Yule. As a result, Yule followed him to Calcutta and demanded that he should alter his decision. After Fendall refused, Yule responded by brushing the papers against his face in a confrontational manner, suggesting Fendall take it as a personal insult. This, Fendall was quite ready to do and sent for a friend, named Assey, to take a challenge to the Colonel. Assey refused to have anything to do with a challenge, in spite of Fendall’s protests, and took the matter to various members of Council. The Council agreed that Fendall could not be called on to defend an official act in such a way and that Yule’s conduct was highly insubordinate. As the Governor-General agreed with them, Fendall was forbidden to fight and his opponent apologised to escape being tried by court martial.

=== Supreme Council appointment ===
Fendall was transferred to Bengal, and was appointed a member of the Supreme Council of Bengal on 20 May 1820, which constituted membership in the Bengal Civil Service. In 1823 was appointed President of the Board of Trade on the Bengal Establishment. During his time on the Council, he took part in deliberations concerning land revenue policy, as evidenced by his participation in the council’s proceedings on specific dates in 1820, showing his endorsement for a fixed revenue system in the northern territories under British administration.

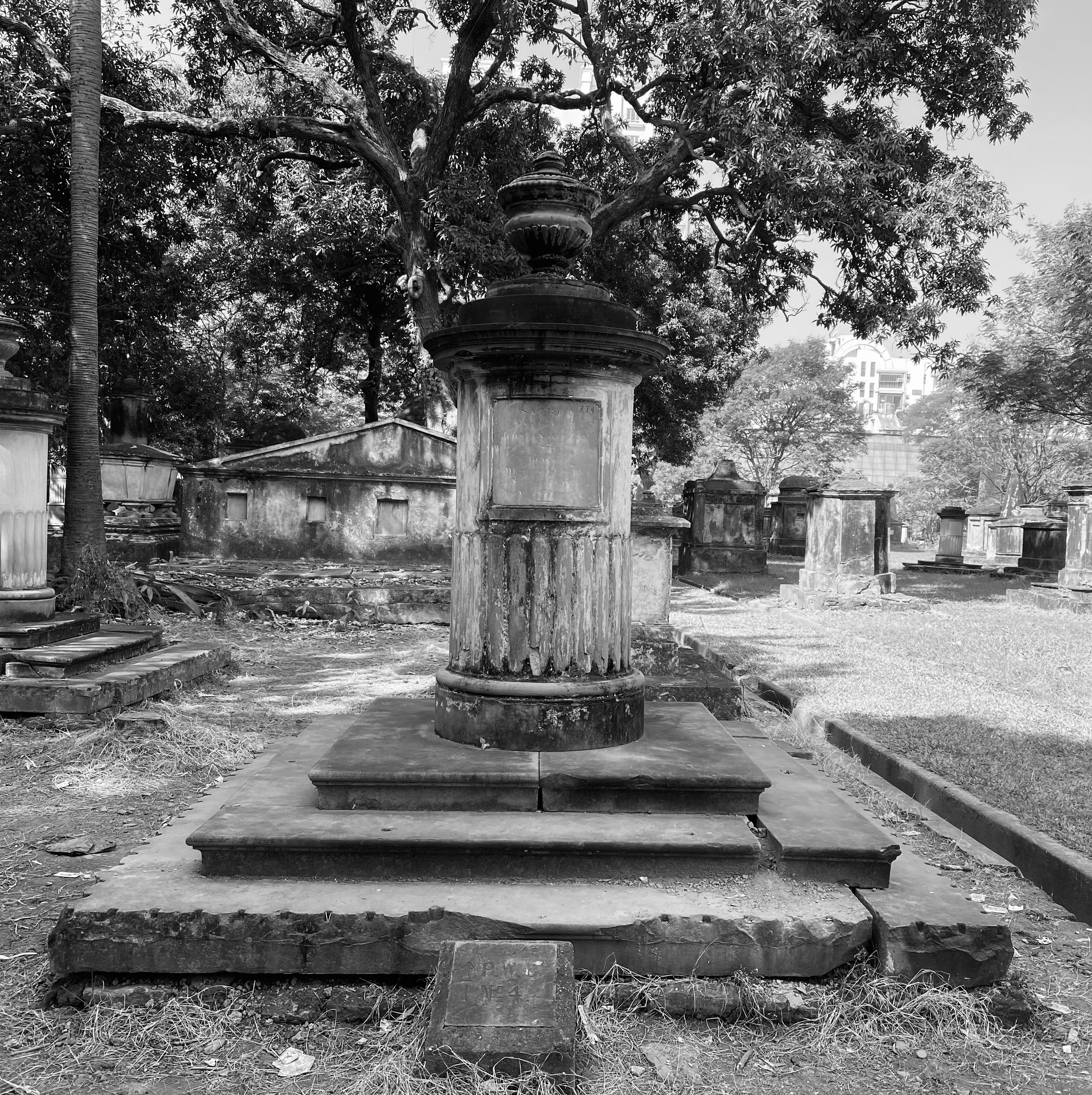
Gravestone of John Fendall, South Park Street Cemetery, Kolkata

Fendall died on 10 November 1825 in Calcutta and was buried at South Park Street Cemetery.

== Personal life ==
Fendall married first in 1790, Mary Farquharson (1761–1818), the daughter of John Farquharson of Yateley, Hampshire, England, a scion of the family of Farquharson of Fingean. They had seven children, William Fendall (1793–1888), Mary Fendall (later Mary D'Oyly) (1794–1885), Harriet Fendall (later Harriet Thompson) (1797–1842), Harriet Fendall (later Harriet Moultrie) (1797–1867), Louisa Fendall (1799–1899), James Fendall (1801–1866) and Sophia Fendall (1805–1808).

Fendall married second, Harriet "Henrietta" Halcott (died 1871) in 1820. They had one son, Thomas Halcott Fendall (1825–1865).

Fendall had two residences. One was at Harewood Square, Marylebone, London, England. The other was 67 Great Portland St., Marylebone, London, England, a house that had belonged to his grandfather.

Political offices
Preceded by Thomas Stamford Raffles	Lieutenant-Governor of the Dutch East Indies; 1816	Succeeded by Godert van der Capellen; Cornelis Theodorus Elout; Arnold Adriaan Buyskes as Commissioners-General
