= Travers (surname) =

Origin
- Languages: Anglo-Norman Old French; Middle English (ME); Irish Gaelic
- Origin: travers (ME: toll or tolltaker on bridges, etc.) from traverser (Norman: to cross); Ó Treabhair (Irish: descendant of Treabhair; skillful)

Other names
- Variant forms: Travis, Trevors, Travors, Trower, Trover, Trevir

Travers is an Irish and English surname. Notable people with the surname include:

- Allan Travers (1892–1968), baseball pitcher
- Ben Travers (1886–1980), English writer
- Bill Travers (1922–1994), English actor, screenwriter, director and animal rights activist
- Bill Travers (baseball) (born 1952), baseball pitcher
- Dan Travers (born 1956), Scottish badminton player
- David Travers, Australian corporate advisor and public servant
- Dow Travers (born 1987), Caymanian athlete
- Emily Travers, New Zealand cricketer
- Francis Travers, English cricketer
- Frederick Dudley Travers (1897–?), English aviator
- George Travers (1888–1946), English footballer
- George Travers (rugby union) (1877–1945), Welsh rugby player
- Henry Travers (1874–1965), English actor
- Herbert Travers (1891–1958), British aviator
- James Travers (1820–1884), Anglo-Irish recipient of the Victorian Cross
- Jerome Travers (1887–1951), American golfer
- Joe Travers (1871–1942), Australian cricketer
- John Travers (actor) (born 1989), Irish actor
- John Travers (composer) (1703–1758), English composer
- John Raymond Travers (born 1967), Australian convicted of the 1986 murder of Anita Cobby
- Lily Travers, British actress and model
- Linden Travers (1913–2001), British actress
- Mark Travers (born 1999), Irish footballer
- Mary Travers (1936–2009), American singer; member of the folk music trio Peter, Paul and Mary
- Mary Travers (journalist) (born 1958), American television journalist
- Mary Rose-Anna Travers (1894–1941), Québécoise singer known as Madame Bolduc or La Bolduc
- Morris Travers (1872–1961), English chemist
- P. L. Travers (1899–1996), Australian author, Mary Poppins
- Paddy Travers (1883–1962), Scottish footballer and manager
- Pat Travers (born 1954), Canadian rock guitarist and singer
- Peter Travers, American film critic
- Susan Travers (1909–2003), English soldier and adventurer who served with the French Foreign Legion
- Thomas Otho Travers (1785–1844), Irish soldier, friend and aide-de-camp to Sir Stamford Rafffles
- Walter Travers (1548?–1635), English Puritan theologian
- William Travers (New Zealand politician) (1819–1903), New Zealand lawyer, politician, explorer, and naturalist
- William R. Travers (1819–1887), American lawyer and investor

Fictional characters include:

- Angela Travers, in P. G. Wodehouse's Jeeves stories
- Boyd Travers, protagonist in the computer game Medal of Honor: Airborne
- Cody Travers, lead character in the Final Fight video games
- Dahlia Travers, known as Aunt Dahlia, in P. G. Wodehouse's Jeeves stories
- Kyle Travers, Cody's brother and protagonist in the video game Final Fight: Streetwise
- Quentin Travers, a member of the Watchers' Council in the TV series Buffy the Vampire Slayer
- Torquil Travers, a member of the Pure-blood Travers family from J. K. Rowling's Harry Potter series.
- Richard Travers, a character played by Rex Linn in the 1993 film Cliffhanger
- President Michelle Travers, a character played by Kari Matchett in the Netflix series The Night Agent
