= Supreme Council of Bengal =

- Formation: 1774
- Dissolved: 1833
- Headquarters: Calcutta, British India
- Location: Bengal Presidency, British India
- Official languages: English

The Supreme Council of Bengal, also known as Council of Four, was the highest level of executive government in British India from 1774 to 1833: the period in which the East India Company, a private company, exercised political control of British colonies in India. It was formally subordinate to both the East India Company's Court of Directors and to the British Crown.

The Council was established by the British government, under Regulating Act 1773. It consisted of four members. The Governor General was given a casting vote but no veto. It was appointed by the Court of Directors (board) of the East India Company. At times it also included the British military Commander-in-Chief of India (although this post was usually held concurrently by the Governor General). Hence the council was also known as Governor-General in Council.

The Government of India Act 1833 formally separated the East India Company from political control, and the governor-general of Bengal became the governor general of India. Since the Government of India Act 1858, the council was known as the Viceroy's Executive Council.

== History ==
The Regulating Act 1773 created the post of Governor-General of the Presidency of Fort William in Bengal and the presidencies of Bombay and Madras were made subordinate to the Bengal Presidency. Prior to this all the three presidencies were independent of each other and was headed by Governor General and his Council or Governor-in-council. The act designated Governor of Bengal as the Governor of the Presidency of Fort William to serve as Governor General of all British Territories in India. It also added provision that Governor General was to be assisted by an executive council of four members and was given a casting vote but no veto. This changed the structure of Governor in-council where Governor General was the sole authority to a council of 5 members. The members could only be removed by the British Monarch on representation from Court of Directors.

In 1774, Warren Hastings became the first Governor-General of the Presidency of Fort William, hence, the first head of the Supreme Council of Bengal. Other members of the council included Lt. General John Clavering, George Monson, Richard Barwell and Philip Francis.

Philip Francis along with Monson and Clavering reached Calcutta in October 1774, and a conflict with Warren Hastings started almost immediately. These three members of the council opposed Hasting's policies as Governor General and accused him of corruption. The situation climaxed with the Maharaja Nanda Kumar affair - in which Nanda Kumar accused Hastings of fraud and high corruption. This attempt to impeach Hastings was unsuccessful and Nanda Kumar was hanged in 1775 after being found guilty of forgery by Supreme Court of Bengal in Calcutta. The trial was held under childhood friend of Hastings Sir Elijah Impey - India's first Chief Justice. The majority - Francis, Clavering and Monson - within the council ended with Monson's death in 1776. Clavering died a year later and Francis was left powerless, but he remained in India and strove to undermine Hastings' governance. The bitter rivalry between the two men culminated in a duel in 1780, where Hastings shot Francis in the back. Francis left India in the hope of impeaching Hastings in 1780. Hastings resigned in 1785 and was later accused of committing a judicial murder of Nanda Kumar. Impeachment proceedings against him along with Elijah Impey were initiated by the parliament. A lengthy attempted impeachment by Parliament lasted from 1788 to 1795 eventually ending with Hastings being acquitted.

== Conflict with Supreme Court of Judicature at Fort William ==
From 1774 (when the Supreme Court of Judicature at Fort William was founded) till 1782 (when Bengal Judicature Act 1781 was passed), the court claimed jurisdiction over any person residing in Bengal, Bihar or Orissa. This resulted in conflict of jurisdiction with Supreme Council of Bengal. The conflict came to an end with Parliament's passing of the Bengal Judicature Act 1781. The act restricted the Supreme Court's jurisdiction to either those who lived in Calcutta, or to any British Subject in Bengal, Bihar and Odisha. This removed the Court's jurisdiction over any person residing in Bengal, Bihar and Odisha.

== Role ==
The Regulating Act 1773 made presidencies of Bombay and Madras subordinate to Bengal. Governor-in-Council of Bombay and Madras presidencies were required to obey the orders of Governor General of Bengal. Governor-General-in-Council was given the power to make rules, ordinances and regulations. These rules and regulations were required to be registered with the Supreme court and could only be dissolved by the King-in-Council within 2 years.

== Notable members ==
- Warren Hastings from October 20, 1774, to his resignation on February 8, 1785.
- George Monson from October 20, 1774, to his death on September 25, 1776.
- John Clavering from October 20, 1774, to his death on August 30, 1777.
- Richard Barwell from October 20, 1774, to his departure on March 2, 1780. Officially resigned on October 1, 1781.
- Philip Francis from October 20, 1774, to his departure on December 3, 1780. Officially resigned on December 12, 1781.
- Edward Wheler from December 11, 1777, to his death on October 10, 1784.
- Eyre Coote from March 25, 1779, to his death on April 26, 1783.
- John Macpherson from October 1, 1781, to his departure on September 11, 1786.
- John Stables from November 11, 1782, to his resignation on January 19, 1787.
- Charles Stuart from February 28, 1785, to his resignation on January 21, 1793.
- Archibald Seton from 1812 to 1818.
- John Fendall from May 20, 1820, to his death on November 10, 1825.

== See also ==
- East India Company
- Council of India
- Privy Council of England
