= Christopher K. Travis =

- Occupations: Writer, publisher, theorist, residential designer
- Employer(s): Sentient Architecture LLC, managing partner

Christopher K. Travis Colorado. Travis has served as a consultant and lead designer for residential and historic projects in Texas and Colorado since 1975. He is best known for using psychological and therapeutic methods to inform the design of homes and other buildings, a process that has been referred to as "emotional architecture." Travis' work was profiled in Samuel D. Gosling's book Snoop: What Your Stuff Says About You.

== Career ==
After designing and building in Houston, Texas, Travis moved to Round Top, Texas in 1992 and bought a Texas walnut cabin and restored it. Shortly after he finished the cabin, his restoration, design, and construction business began to grow and Travis began utilizing psychological techniques in the design and planning of projects for his clients. He began each design process with psychological questionnaire and used their responses to tailor his designs to their personalities, values and lifestyle.

Travis was influenced by systems theory, perception science and the ideas of Christopher Alexander's A Pattern Language in his work. Travis also learned from the work of physiologist Scott Turner at the State University of New York College of Environmental Science and Forestry, who wrote about animal-built structures, and Irwin Altman, a professor of social psychology at the University of Utah, who studied how environment affects behavior.

=== Sentient Architecture ===
Travis rebranded his practice as Sentient Architecture, LLC with commercial architect Brett Pitt in 2005. Travis was the lead designer for residential and historic projects and Pitt ran the commercial business. In 2006, Travis became the CEO of Truehome while continuing his design practice with Sentient Architecture. Later that year, Cecil Reynolds, a neuropsychologist, behavioral psychologist Samuel D. Gosling, and environmental psychologist, Sally Augustin all became investors and advisers to the company. as did. Gosling and his research assistant, Lindsay Graham, at the University of Texas at Austin who also began a series of research studies based on Travis' methods.

=== Truehome ===
Travis formed Truehome to develop software based on the principles he developed to better understand the psychology of is design clients. Truehome launched a beta version of the software in 2012. In December 2014, it ceased doing business.

== Writing and publishing ==
In 1995, Travis founded Round Top Publishing Company and launched a regional quarterly called the Round Top Register, Travis also writes the Architecture of Life blog where he explores his ideas about psychology and architecture.

Round Top Publishing also published a book of Travis' verse, Deadspace Poetry, taken from the pages of its quarterly newspaper. Travis served as Publisher, Editor and lead writer of the Round Top Register until 2008, then as publisher and writer until the sale of the publication in December 2014.
