= Konsthistorisk tidskrift =

Konsthistorisk tidskrif Journal of Art History
- Discipline: Art history
- Language: English, Swedish, Danish, Norwegian, German
- Edited by: Jessica Sjöholm Skrubbe

Publication details
- History: 1932 to present
- Publisher: Routledge for Konsthistoriska sällskapet (the Society of Art Historians)
- Frequency: Quarterly

Standard abbreviations
- ISO 4: Konsthistorisk Tidskr.

Indexing
- ISSN: 0023-3609 (print); 1651-2294 (web)
- OCLC no.: 46849244

Links
- Journal homepage

Konsthistorisk tidskrift is a quarterly peer-reviewed Swedish academic journal on art history that was established in 1932 by Konsthistoriska sällskapet (the Society of Art Historians) in Stockholm. The journal was published until 1967 under the full title Konsthistorisk tidskrift: revy för konst och konstforskning. Since 2002 it has carried the English alternate title Journal of Art History. It was published by the Scandinavian University Press from 1992 till 1999, and has been published by Routledge (Taylor & Francis Group) since 2000.

== History ==
Konsthistoriska sällskapet, the Society of Art Historians, was founded in 1914 on the initiative of Osvald Sirén, J. A. Berg Professor of Art History in Stockholm, and Johnny Roosval, then docent of Art History (later professor). The society was clearly Stockholm-centric from the start: Sirén and Roosval became chairman and vice chairman, respectively. The rest of the board consisted of representatives of the major museums in Stockholm, the director of the Bukowskis auction house there, and the other universities in Lund, Uppsala and Gothenburg each having one representative (Ewert Wrangel, August Hahr and Axel Romdahl, respectively).

Konsthistorisk tidskrift had a predecessor in the first periodical of the society, Konsthistoriska sällskapets publikation, which was published 1915–1925. From 1926, it was absorbed into the journal Tidskrift för konstvetenskap, which had been published at the University of Lund since 1916. At the annual meeting of Konsthistoriska sällskapet in 1931, the board of the Society proposed re-establishing a periodical of its own, as

despite the merits of [Tidskrift för konstvetenskap], it has become apparent that it would be more suitable for the publication of the Society to be edited from Stockholm, as most art historical authors and most members live here, and it must, additionally, be easier to satisfy the interests of art history and the art collectors in all parts of the country with Stockholm as the base.

The journal was to be of approximately the same size as the previous publication and would be distributed to members with no change in fees. After a short debate, the meeting agreed to the proposition of the board. Professor Axel Romdahl from Gothenburg suggested a division of the field between the two journals in some way and offered to negotiate this with representatives of the other journal.

The 1960-1984 annual volumes of the journal included "Svensk konsthistorisk bibliografi" (from 1976 known as "konstvetenskaplig bibliografi"), an annual cumulative bibliography of art history published in Sweden, covering the years 1959–1985.

== Editors ==
The journal originally had an editorial group consisting of an ansvarig utgivare ("publisher", the person responsible for the publication under Tryckfrihetsförordningen, the Swedish Freedom of the Press Act) and one or several redaktör[er] ("editor[s]").

The position of ansvarig utgivare ("publisher") for the journal has been held by:

- Johnny Roosval (1932-1965:1/2)
- Sten Karling (1965:3/4–1973)
- Patrik Reuterswärd (1974–1990)
- Hans Henrik Brummer (1991)

The position of redaktör, ("editor") for the journal has been held by:

- Georg Svensson (1932–1944)
- Kjell Boström, Aron Andersson, Axel Boëthius and Georg Svensson (1945)
- Kjell Boström, Aron Andersson and Georg Svensson (1946:1-2)
- Johnny Roosval (1947)
- Sten Karling (1948–1973)
- Lars Olof Larsson and Ingrid Sjöström (1974–1980)
- Götz Pochat and Patrik Reuterswärd (1981:1)
- Patrik Reuterswärd (1981:2–1990)

Since 1992 the person responsible for the journal has been described by the English title "Editor-in-chief" and has been:

- Hans Henrik Brummer (1992–2001)
- Margaretha Rossholm Lagerlöf (2002–2009?)
- Dan Karlholm (2009–2018)
- The current editor in chief is Jessica Sjöholm Skrubbe (since 2019).

In addition, the journal has and has had a larger advisory committee. The first issue from 1932 listed one consisting of 27 people.

== Recognition ==
The journal is financially supported by the Swedish Research Council. The European Reference Index for the Humanities classifies Konsthistorisk tidskrift as a category "A" journal in the field of Art, Architectural and Design History (2008). It is also included in the American Arts & Humanities Citation Index, and an American librarian has described it as "a major Scandinavian art history journal that is highly regarded in the United States".
