= John Travis =

John Travis may refer to:

- John Travis (physician), leading figure in the wellness movement
- John Travis (producer), music producer, audio engineer, mixer and songwriter
- John Travis (soccer) (1917–2005), former U.S. soccer player
- John D. Travis (1940–2016), former member of the Louisiana House of Representatives
