= Thomas Otho Travers =

Thomas Otho Travers (25 September 1785 – 9 July 1844) was a soldier, a friend of (and later aide-de-camp to) Stamford Raffles, and author of The Journal of Thomas Otho Travers 1813-1820, published more than a century after his death.

He was born in Patrick Street, Cork, Ireland to Robert Travers a banker and Commissioner of the Peace for County Cork. Thomas was twelve years old when his father died, and became a cadet with the East India Company in 1803, arriving in Bengal on 2 September 1804. He was commissioned as a Lieutenant of the 20th Regiment, Bengal Native Infantry on the 21st of the same month.

In 1806 he was posted with his Regiment to Prince of Wales' Island (Penang), where he was to meet Stamford Raffles. By 1811, Raffes was both de facto and de jure Lieutenant-Governor of Java and Travers and Captain Robert C. Garnham were Raffles' aides-de-camp. In 1815, control of Java reverted to the Dutch and in early 1816, Travers accompanied Raffles on a tour of the Island made to help smooth the transition.

Travers then accompanied Raffles on his return to England in late 1816. Travers spent some time in Ireland, where he attended the wedding of his sister, Harriet, to Thomas Browne of Somerset House. In early 1817, Travers was again with Raffles in England, and often served as an escort for Raffles' new wife, Sophia. Later in 1817, That summer, Travers returned to Ireland to court Mary Leslie while Raffles toured Europe. Travers was engaged to Leslie by the end of July and travelled to Ireland on 24 July to get married.

As summer came to an end, Raffles received a posting at British Bencoolen with headquarters at Fort Marlborough in Sumatra and Travers accompanied him, leaving England in late October or early November and arriving in India on 19 March 1818 after a 14,244-mile voyage with no intermediate stops. In Bencoolen, Mary had her first child in July 1818.

In March 1820, Raffles appointed Travers, who had by then had a child, then his acting second assistant, to be Resident and Commandant at Singapore, to replace William Farquhar. Although Farquhar had requested the change, he decided that he preferred not to relinquish his position. After working a short time in Singapore as an assistant to Farquhar, Travers decided to return to Europe in December.

Travers eventually returned to his home to Ireland, where he did not again meet Raffles until October 1824. Raffles, and to a lesser extent, Travers, were put into financial difficulties by the Panic of 1825, and Travers had some money invested in McQuoid & Company, a concern which went bankrupt in March. In April, Travers and Mary moved to London to apartments on South Audley Street. Raffles died later that year and Travers continued to visit with Sophia and help her with a biography of Raffles which was published in 1830.

Travers' diary is a notable work used for understanding Raffles and for understanding that period in East India Company history. No volume of his diary before 1813 survives, although excerpts from the earlier period survive in a memorandum prepared by Travers at the request of Raffles second wife.

Travers died in July 1844 at Leemount, his home in County Cork, Ireland.

== Bibliography ==
- Wurtzburg, Charles Edward. Raffles of the eastern isles. Hodder and Stoughton, 1954.
