= Governorate of the Banda Islands =

Dutch colony in Indonesia (1609–1798)

Governorate of the Banda Islands Gouvernement Banda-eilanden
- 1609–1798
- Flag Coat of arms

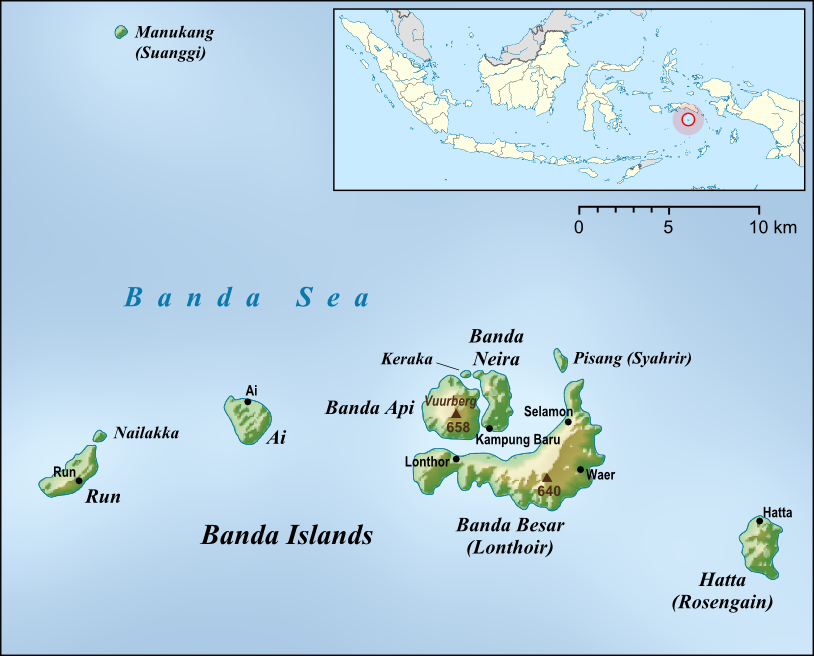
- Map of the Banda Islands
- Status: Dutch colony
- Capital: Fort Nassau (1609-1611); Fort Belgica (1611-1798)
- Common languages: Dutch
- Governor
- Historical era: Imperialism
  - Building of Fort Nassau on the ruins of a Portuguese fort: 1609
  - Nationalisation of VOC possessions by the Batavian Republic: 17 March 1798
Preceded by	Succeeded by
Portuguese Empire	Dutch East Indies

The Banda Islands were a governorate of the Dutch East India Company. The governorate comprised Banda Neira, Banda Besar, Pulau Ai, Run, Banda Api, and some smaller islands.

The Banda Islands were the centre of nutmeg production.

== History ==
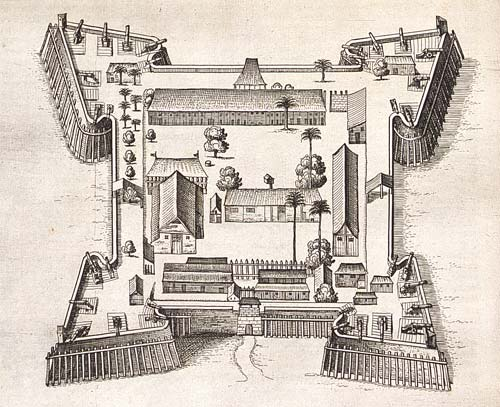
Fort Nassau in 1646

The Portuguese first sailed to the Banda Islands in 1512, a year after Afonso de Albuquerque had conquered Malacca, which at the time was the hub of Asian trade. Only in 1529 did the Portuguese return to the islands, when Captain Garcia attempted to build a fort on Banda Neira. The local Bandanese turned against Garcia and his crew, forcing him to abandon his plans. From that moment, the Portuguese preferred to buy nutmeg from traders in Malacca.

The Dutch followed the Portuguese to Banda but were to have a much more dominating and lasting presence. Dutch-Bandanese relations were mutually resentful from the outset, with the first Dutch merchants complaining of Bandanese reneging on agreed deliveries and price, and cheating on quantity and quality. For the Bandanese, on the other hand, although they welcomed another competitor purchaser for their spices, the items of trade offered by the Dutch—heavy woollens, and damasks, unwanted manufactured goods, for example—were usually unsuitable in comparison to traditional trade products. The Javanese, Arab and Indian, and Portuguese traders for example brought indispensable items along steel knives, copper, medicines and prized Chinese porcelain.

As much as the Dutch disliked dealing with the Bandanese, the trade was a highly profitable one, with spices selling for 300 times the purchase price in Banda. This amply justified the expense and risk in shipping them to Europe. The allure of such profits saw an increasing number of Dutch expeditions. It was soon seen that in trade with the East Indies, competition from each would eat into all their profits. Thus in 1602, the competitors united to form the Dutch East India Company, which received a monopoly of trade with the East Indies from the States-General of the Dutch Republic.

Until the early seventeenth century the Bandas were ruled by a group of leading citizens, the orang kaya (literally 'rich men'), each of these was a head of district. At the time nutmeg was one of the "fine spices" kept expensive in Europe by disciplined manipulation of the market, but a desirable commodity for Dutch traders in the ports of India as well; economic historian Fernand Braudel notes that India consumed twice as much as Europe. A number of Banda's orang kaya were persuaded (or deceived) by the Dutch to sign a treaty granting the Dutch a monopoly on spice purchases. Even though the Bandanese had little understanding of the significance of the treaty known as 'The Eternal Compact', or that not all Bandanese leaders had signed, it would later be used to justify Dutch troops being brought in to defend their monopoly.

The Bandanese soon grew tired of the Dutch actions; the low prices, the useless trade items, and the enforcement of Dutch sole rights to the purchase of the coveted spices. The end of the line for the Bandanese came in 1609 when the Dutch reinforced Fort Nassau on Bandanaira Island. The orang kaya called a meeting with the Dutch admiral Pieter Willemsz. Verhoef and forty of his highest-ranking men and ambushed and killed them all.

=== English-Dutch rivalry ===
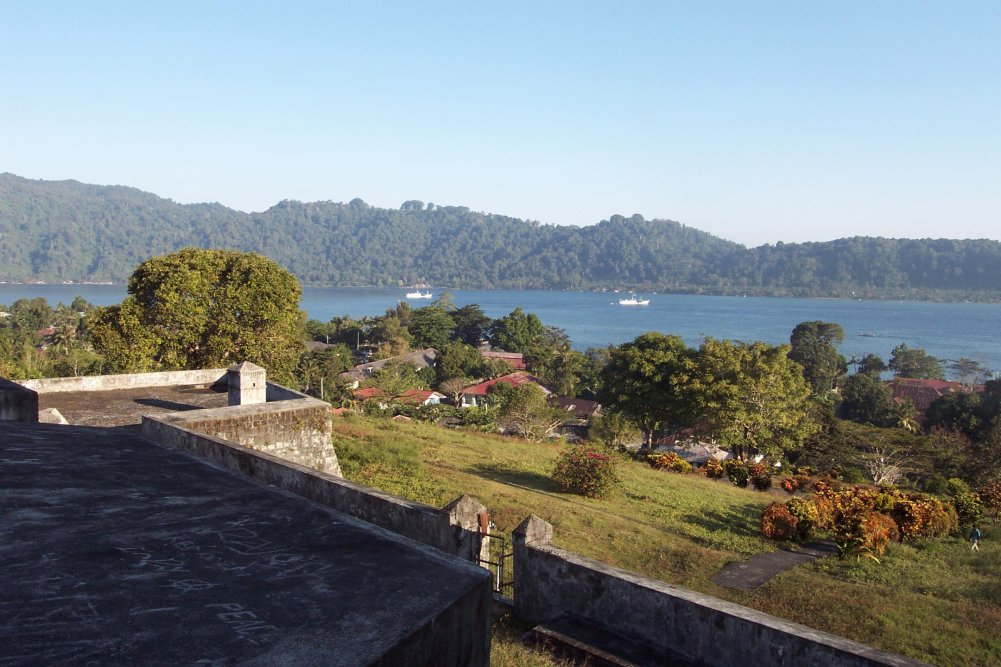
View from Fort Belgica.

While Portuguese and Spanish activity in the region had weakened, the English had built fortified trading posts on tiny Ai and Run islands, ten to twenty kilometres from the main Banda Islands. With the British paying higher prices, they were significantly undermining Dutch aims for a monopoly. As Dutch-British tensions increased in 1611 the Dutch built the larger and more strategic Fort Belgica above Fort Nassau.

In 1615, the Dutch invaded Ai with 900 men whereupon the British retreated to Run where they regrouped. That same night, the British launched a surprise counter-attack on Ai, retaking the island and killing 200 Dutchmen. A year later, a much stronger Dutch force attacked Ai. This time the defenders were able to hold off the attack with cannon fire, but after a month of siege they ran out of ammunition. The Dutch slaughtered the defenders, and afterwards strengthened the fort, renaming it 'Fort Revenge'.

=== Massacre of the Bandanese ===
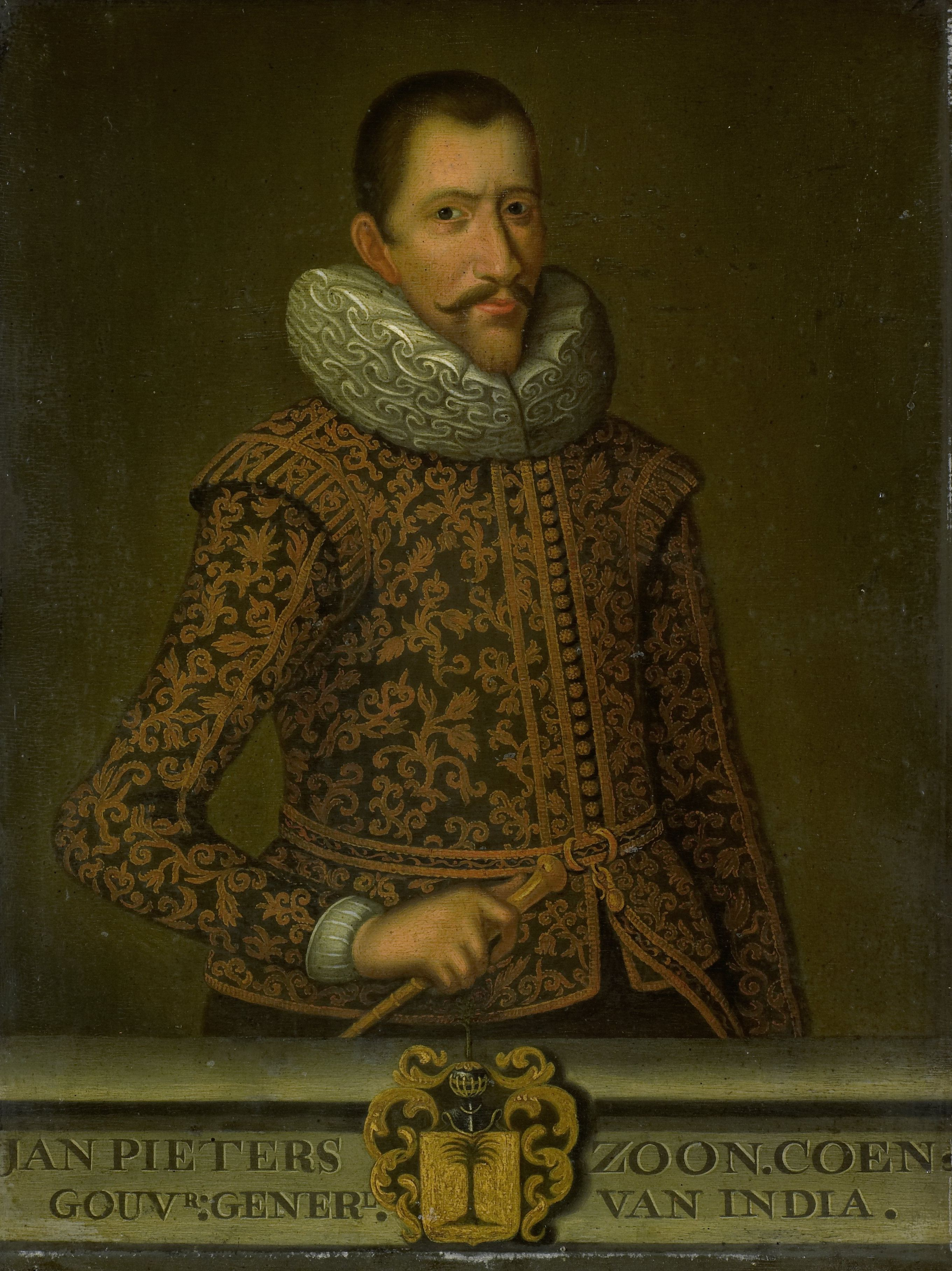
Jan Pieterszoon Coen ordered the massacre of the Bandanese.

Newly appointed VOC governor-general Jan Pieterszoon Coen set about enforcing Dutch monopoly over the Banda's spice trade. In 1621 well-armed soldiers were landed on Bandaneira Island and within a few days they had also occupied neighbouring and larger Lontar. The orang kaya were forced at gunpoint to sign an unfeasibly arduous treaty, one that was in fact impossible to keep, thus providing Coen an excuse to use superior Dutch force against the Bandanese. The Dutch quickly noted a number of alleged violations of the new treaty, in response to which Coen launched a punitive massacre. Japanese mercenaries were hired to deal with the orang kaya, forty of whom were beheaded with their heads impaled and displayed on bamboo spears.

The population of the Banda Islands prior to Dutch conquest is generally estimated to have been around 13,000-15,000 people, some of whom were Malay and Javanese traders, as well as Chinese and Arabs. The actual numbers of Bandanese who were killed, forcibly expelled or fled the islands in 1621 remain uncertain. But readings of historical sources suggest around one thousand Bandanese likely survived in the islands, and were spread throughout the nutmeg groves as forced labourers. The Dutch subsequently re-settled the islands with imported slaves, convicts and indentured labourers (to work the nutmeg plantations), as well as immigrants from elsewhere in Indonesia. Most survivors fled as refugees to the islands of their trading partners, in particular Keffing and Guli Guli in the Seram Laut chain and Kei Besar. Shipments of surviving Bandanese were also sent to Batavia (Jakarta) to work as slaves in developing the city and its fortress. Some 530 of these individuals were later returned to the islands because of their much-needed expertise in nutmeg cultivation (something sorely lacking among newly arrived Dutch settlers).

Whereas up until this point the Dutch presence had been simply as traders, that was sometimes treaty-based, the Banda conquest marked the start of the first overt colonial rule in Indonesia albeit under the auspices of the VOC.

=== VOC Monopoly ===
Having drastically reduced the islands' native population, Coen divided the productive land of approximately half a million nutmeg trees into sixty-eight 1.2-hectare perken. These land parcels were then handed to Dutch planters known as perkeniers of which 34 were on Lontar, 31 on Ai and 3 on Neira. With few Bandanese left to work them, slaves from elsewhere were brought in. Now enjoying control of the nutmeg production the VOC paid the perkeniers 1/122nd of the Dutch market price for nutmeg, however, the perkeniers still profited immensely building substantial villas with opulent imported European decorations.

The outlying island of Run was harder for the VOC to control and they exterminated all nutmeg trees there. The production and export of nutmeg was a VOC monopoly for almost two hundred years. Fort Belgica, one of many forts built by the Dutch East India Company, is one of the largest remaining European forts in Indonesia.

European control of the Bandas was contested up until 1667 when, under the Treaty of Breda (1667), the small island of Run was awarded to the Dutch, giving them full control of the Banda archipelago.

=== The end of the Dutch East India Company ===
After the Batavian Republic replaced the Dutch Republic in 1795, the Dutch West India Company was nationalized. On 1 March 1796, the directors of the Dutch East India Company were replaced by the government-controlled Committee for East Indian trade and possessions, and on 17 March 1798, the Dutch East India Company was formally nationalized, with all its possessions reverting to direct control by the Dutch government.

== Sources ==
- Braudel, Fernand. 1984. The Perspective of the World. In: Civilization and Capitalism, vol. III.
- Hanna, Willard A. (1991). Indonesian Banda: Colonialism and its Aftermath in the Nutmeg Islands. Bandanaira: Yayasan Warisan dan Budaya Banda Naira.
- Loth, Vincent C. 1995. Pioneers and perkerniers:the Banda Islands in the seventeenth century. Cakalele 6: 13-35.
