= Dutch conquest of the Banda Islands =

1609–1621 Dutch East India Company campaign

- Part of the European colonization of Asia
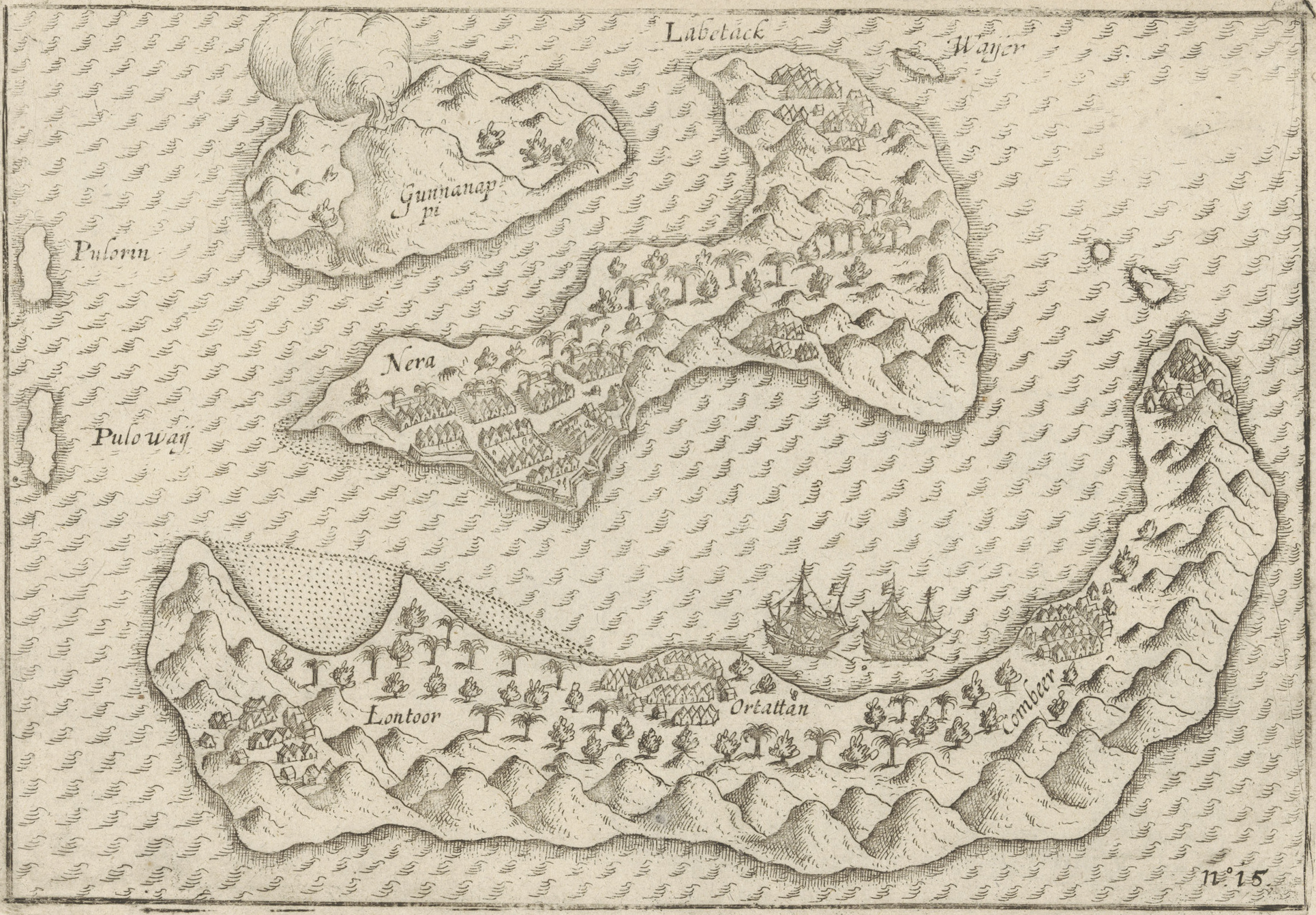
- Dutch map of the Banda Islands, dated c. 1599–1619
Date	May 1609 – late 1621
Location	Banda Islands
Result	Dutch victory

Belligerents
Dutch East India Company: Japanese mercenaries	Bandanese fighters East India Company

Commanders and leaders
(Dutch East India Company) Pieter Verhoeff † (Dutch East India Company) Piet Hein (Dutch East India Company) Gerard Reynst (Dutch East India Company) Jan Dirkszoon Lam (Dutch East India Company) Jan Pieterszoon Coen (Dutch East India Company) Martinus Sonck	Jareng; Dirck Callenbacker; Various orang kaya

Strength
Unknown	Total population including civilians estimated 15,000

Casualties and losses
Unknown	c. 14,000 dead, enslaved or fled elsewhere

The Dutch conquest of the Banda Islands, also referred to as the Banda genocide, was a process of military conquest from 1609 to 1621 by the Dutch East India Company of the Banda Islands. The Dutch, having enforced a monopoly on the highly lucrative nutmeg production from the islands, were impatient with Bandanese resistance to Dutch demands that the Bandanese sell only to them. Negotiations collapsed after Bandanese village elders deceived and murdered the Dutch representative Pieter Willemsz Verhoeff. Under the command of Jan Pieterszoon Coen, the Dutch resorted to a forcible conquest of the islands, which became severely depopulated as a result of Coen's massacres, forced deportations, and the resulting starvation and disease.

The Dutch East India Company, which was founded in 1602 as an amalgamation of 12 voorcompagnies, had extensive financial interests in maritime Southeast Asia, the source of highly profitable spices, which were in high demand in Europe. A Dutch expedition had already made contact with the islands in 1599, signing several contracts with Bandanese chiefs. The profitability of the spices was heightened by the fact that they grew nowhere else on Earth, making them extremely valuable to whoever controlled them. As the Dutch attempted to form a monopoly over the spices and forbid the Bandanese from selling to any other group, they resisted, and the Dutch decided to conquer the islands by force. With the aid of Japanese mercenaries, the Dutch launched several military expeditions against the Bandanese.

The conquest culminated in the Banda massacre, which saw 2,800 Bandanese killed and 1,700 enslaved by the Dutch. Along with starvation and constant fighting, the Bandanese felt they could not continue to resist the Dutch and negotiated a surrender in 1621. Jan Pieterszoon Coen, the official in charge of the fighting, expelled the remaining 1,000 Bandanese to Batavia. With the Bandanese resistance ended, the Dutch secured their valuable monopoly on the spice trade.

== Background ==
The first Dutch expedition to explore the Banda Islands, as well as Banten, Ternate and Ambon, was launched by a voorcompagnie on 1 May 1598. A fleet commanded by Jacob Corneliszoon van Neck, Jacob van Heemskerck and Wybrand van Warwijck set sail and made contact with the inhabitants of the Banda Islands in 1599. Heemskerck signed several contracts with Bandanese chieftains and constructed a spice trading outpost. The volcanic Banda Islands were found to be unique due to the availability of nutmeg and mace, which grew nowhere else in the world and therefore had extreme commercial value.

== Early trade and conflicts ==
=== Battle of Banda Neira ===
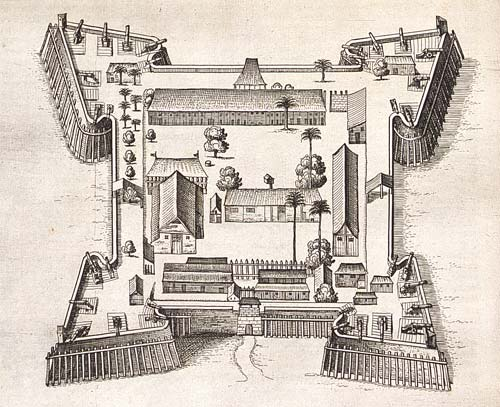
Fort Nassau on Banda Neira in 1646.

The Dutch East India Company (known by its Dutch acronym, VOC) was founded on 20 March 1602 as a merger of the twelve voorcompagnieën, with the exclusive right to all Dutch navigation and trade in Asia and the East Indies, including the right to conclude treaties, declare and wage war, and establish fortresses and trading posts. In early April 1609, a Dutch fleet commanded by Pieter Willemsz Verhoeff arrived at Banda Neira and wanted to force the establishment of a fortress. The Bandanese preferred free trade so that they could play off the various European countries' merchants against each other and sell their products to the highest bidder. However, the Dutch sought to establish a monopoly on the spice trade so that the Bandanese could sell their products only to the Dutch. Negotiations were arduous, and, at a certain point in late May 1609, the chieftains lured Verhoeff and two other commanders who had left their fleet to negotiate on the beach, into the woods into an ambush and killed them. Their guard was also massacred by the Bandanese, so that a total of 46 Dutchmen were killed. In retaliation, the Dutch soldiers plundered several Bandanese villages and destroyed their boats. In August, a peace favourable to the Dutch was signed: the Bandanese recognised Dutch authority and monopoly on the spice trade. That same year, Fort Nassau was built on Banda Neira to control the nutmeg trade.

=== Expeditions against Lontor, Run, and Ai ===
Piet Hein replaced Verhoeff as the fleet's commander. Having finished constructing Fort Nassau, the fleet sailed north to Ternate, whose sultan allowed the Dutch to rebuild an old damaged Malay fortress that was renamed Fort Oranje in 1609. This became the de facto capital of the Dutch East India Company until Batavia (modern-day Jakarta) was founded on Java in 1619. The Dutch got involved in a brief war between Ternate and the nearby island kingdom of Tidore. In March 1610, Hein arrived on Ambon and, after long but ultimately successful trade negotiations on a large clove purchase with the Ambonese from March to November 1610, he conducted two punitive military expeditions in early 1611 against the Bandanese isles of Lontor (also known as Lontar or Banda Besar) and Pulo Run. Thereafter, he was tasked to build Fort Belgica on Banda Neira, which became the third Dutch fortress on the Banda Islands. A 1610 Dutch attack on the island of Ai, however, proved to be a failure.

=== Conquest of Ai ===
The Bandanese resented the violently imposed obligation to trade exclusively with the Dutch. They violated their treaty with the Dutch by trading with the English (who offered better prices), and Malay, Javanese and Makassarese traders (who sold the spices on to the Portuguese). Unwilling to accept this obstacle to their commercial interests any longer, the VOC's governing body, Heeren XVII, concluded by 1614 that it was necessary to conquer the entire Bandanese archipelago, even if it meant the destruction of the native population and a heavy burden on the company's finances. To that end, Governor-General Gerard Reynst took an army to Banda Neira on 21 March 1615, and then launched a punitive expedition against the island of Ai (or Pulu Ay) on 14 May 1615. The natives' fortresses were initially successfully attacked, but the Dutch troops resorted to plundering too early. The English, who had retreated to Run, regrouped and launched a surprise counterattack that same night in which they managed to kill 200 Dutchmen. Reynst decided to withdraw from Ai, intending to conquer the island later and first preventing the English from obtaining clove at Ambon, but he died of illness in December 1615.

Meanwhile, the Bandanese beseeched the English for protection against possible Dutch retaliation, sending an emissary to the English factory at Banten with a letter, which included the following statements:

Therefore we all desire to come to an agreement with the kinge of England, because nowe the Hollanders doe practise by all meanes possible to conquer our Country and destroy our Religion by reason whereof all of us of the Islands of Banda do utterly hate the sight of theis Hollanders, sonnes of Whores, because they exceed in lying and villainy and desire to overcome all mens Country by Treachery... That if soe be the Kinge of England out of his love towards us will have a care of our Country and Religion and will help us with Artillary powder and shott and help us recover the Castle of Nera, whereby we may be able to make war with the Hollanders, by Gods helpe all the spices, that our land shall yeald, we will sell only to the King of England.

In April 1616, Jan Dirkszoon Lam took 263 men with him and, against fierce resistance, was able to conquer Ai. Lam decided to make an example of the island, killing any native who put up resistance, while another 400 natives (amongst whom were many women and children) drowned while trying to flee to the nearby English-controlled island of Run in the west. This forced the orang kaya on the other Banda Islands once more to sign contracts favourable to the Dutch. Lam ordered the construction of Fort der Wrake (named Fort Revenge by the English) on Ai to emphasise the brutal vengeance the Bandanese should expect to suffer if they broke trade deals with the Dutch. However, even these actions proved to be insufficient to allow the Dutch to form a monopoly over the nutmeg and mace trade. Although initially intimidated, the Lontorese soon resumed trading with former trade partners, including the English, who had established themselves on the islands of Run and Nailaka.

=== Siege of Run ===
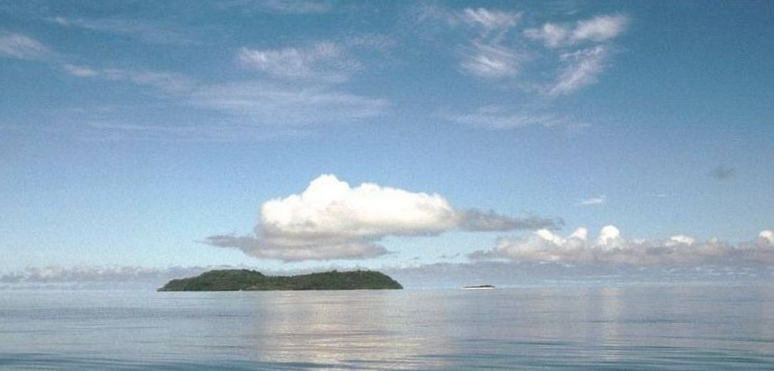
The islands of Run and Nailika, seen from the east in 2006

On 25 December 1616, English merchant-adventurer Nathaniel Courthope landed on the island of Run with 39 men and constructed a fortress on it. He persuaded the inhabitants to sign a contract in which they undertook to accept King James I as the sovereign of the island and to provide the English with nutmeg. The Dutch proceeded to lay siege to the English fortress, which with native assistance managed to resist them for over four years, with the fortress finally falling to the Dutch after Courthope was killed in a skirmish, causing the English to abandon the island. Finally in possession of Run, the Dutch proceeded to kill or enslave all adult men, exile the women and children and chop down every nutmeg tree on the island to make it useless should the English try to re-establish trade on the island. The Dutch allowed some cattle to roam free on Run, in order to provide food for the other islands. It was not until 1638 that the English tried to visit Run again, after which Dutch officials annually visited the island to check if they had secretly re-established themselves until the English formally renounced all claims to the Banda Islands in 1667.

=== Anglo–Dutch conflicts ===
While the siege of Run was ongoing, tensions between the Dutch East India Company and the English East India Company rose and erupted in open naval warfare in 1618. The new VOC Governor-General Jan Pieterszoon Coen wrote a letter, now known as the Appeal of Coen, to the Heeren XVII on 29 September 1618, requesting more soldiers, money, ships and other necessities in order to wage war against both the Bandanese and the English. Being a pious Calvinist, he tried to persuade his superiors that it would be a good investment they would not regret, because the Christian god would support them and bring victory, despite earlier setbacks: 'Despair not, spare not your enemies, there is nothing in the world that can hinder or harm us, for God is with us, and do not draw a conclusion from the preceding failures, because there, in the Indies, something grand can be accomplished.'

The Dutch managed to seize eleven English ships, some of which were carrying cargoes of silver, while the English captured only one Dutch ship. However, this unofficial war was inopportune to the governments back in Europe, who in 1619 concluded peace and a Treaty of Defence between the Dutch Republic and England, as they prioritised a Protestant alliance against Catholic Spain and Portugal with the end of the Twelve Years' Truce nearing. The Heeren XVII ordered Coen to cease hostilities, and cooperate with the English, who would receive one-third of all spices from the Spice Islands and the Dutch the other two-thirds. Coen was furious with the instructions when he received them, as he sought to expel the English from the entire region to form a monopoly on the spice trade, as he wrote to his superiors in a letter:

I admit that the actions of the master are of no concern of the servant... But under correction Your Honours have been too hasty. The English owe you a debt of gratitude, because after they have worked themselves out of the Indies, your Lordships put them right back again... it is incomprehensible that the English should be allowed one third of the cloves, nutmegs and mace, for they cannot lay claim to a single grain of sand in the Moluccas, Amboyna or Banda. (Note: This is a selective English translation by Ian Burnet (2013) of the letter that Coen wrote on 11 May 1620 from Fort Batavia to the Heeren XVII (addressed as U Ed., meaning "You Nobles"). Burnet's translation is composed from the following fragment: 'Lachen d'Engelsen tot danckbaerheyt, soo is den arbeyt niet verlooren. Grooten danck zyn zy U Ed. schuldich, want hadden haer selven met recht uyt Indien geholpen en de Heeren hebben hun daer weder midden in geseth. Meenen zy 't recht en wel, 'tsal wel wesen, maer wederom quaet willende hebt ghylieden, is het te duchten, 't serpent in den boesem geseth. Wy bekennen, dat het den knecht niet en roert, wat de meester doet, maer evenwel doet ons het gemeen gebreck, gelyck de zotten, spreecken, niet om dese vereeninge te bestraffen, want ons kennelyck is, hoeveele de staet der Vereenichde Nederlanden ten hoochsten aen de goede vrientschap, correspondentie en vereeninge van de Croone van Engelandt gelegen is; maer U Ed. zyn, onder correctie, al te haestich geweest, ende waeromme d'Engelsen een derde van de nagelen, noten en foelye vergunt is, connen niet wel begrypen; niet één sandeken van het strandt hadden zy in de Molluccos, Amboyna, noch Banda te pretendeeren. A full modern English translation of the original reads approximately: "The English are laughing out of gratitude, because now their efforts have not been in vain. They owe You Nobles great thanks, for they had just rightly helped themselves out of the Indies, but the Heeren have placed them right back in the midst of it again. If they mean right and well, then it will be well, but [if they are] willing to do evil again, it is to be feared that the serpent has been put right in front of [our] chest. We admit that what the master does is of no concern of the servant. However, our shared problem makes us speak, as the fools do, not to condemn this [peace] agreement – because we understand how important the good friendship, correspondence and association with the Crown of England is to the State of the United Netherlands. But You Nobles have, under correction, been too hasty, and it cannot be well understood why the English should be allowed one third of the cloves, nutmegs and mace; [at the time the peace treaty was signed,] they could not lay claim to [even] a single grain of sand from the beaches in the Moluccas, Amboyna, or Banda.')

== Banda massacre ==
Banda Massacre
- Part of the Dutch conquest of the Banda Islands
Date	7 March – late 1621
Location	Lontor (Banda Besar)
Result	Dutch victory

Belligerents
VOC	Bandanese fighters

Commanders and leaders
Jan Pieterszoon Coen	Unknown

Strength
1,905 European troops; 286 Asian auxiliaries; 45 ships	2,000 combatants 2,500–3,000 civilians

Casualties and losses
7+ killed; 31+ wounded	2,500–2,800 dead; 1,700 enslaved

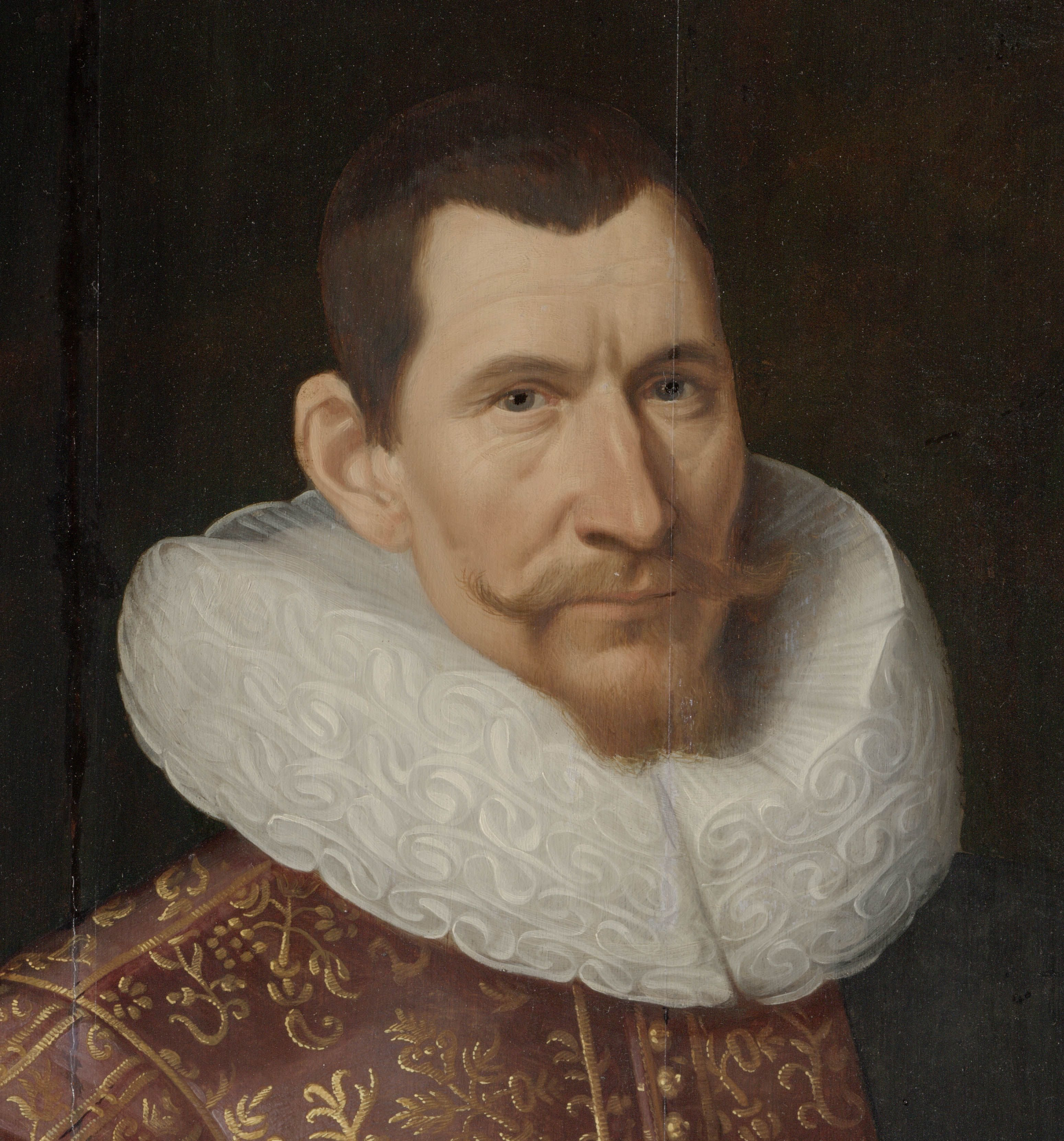
A portrait of Jan Pieterszoon Coen.

Judging that Bandanese resistance to Dutch attempts to establish their commercial supremacy in the archipelago had to be crushed once and for all, Coen wrote a letter to the Heeren XVII on 26 October 1620, stating: 'To adequately deal with this matter, it is necessary to once again subjugate Banda, and populate it with other people.' As proposed, the Heeren XVII instructed him to subjugate the Bandanese and drive their leaders out of the land.

=== Invasion ===
The Dutch fleet from Batavia sailed at the end of 1620. It first arrived at Ambon, where it joined with reinforcements in the form of soldiers and ships before continuing to Banda. The fleet consisted of 19 ships, 1,655 Dutch soldiers and 286 Japanese mercenaries, and was personally led by Coen himself. On 21 February 1621, the fleet arrived in Fort Nassau, where it was reinforced by the fort's 250-strong garrison and 36 native ships.

After unsuccessfully trying to recruit Englishmen from the nearby Run and Ai, Coen began sending scouts to the coastline of Lontor, the main Bandanese island. The reconnaissance took two days, during which some boats came under cannon fire from the Bandanese defenders. The scouts found fortified positions along the southern coast and in the hills and failed to find a possible beachhead. On 7 March, a Dutch probing party landed on the island but was repulsed after suffering one man killed and four wounded.

On 11 March, Coen ordered an all-out offensive. He divided his forces into several groups, which attacked different points on the island. The Dutch swiftly captured key strongholds and by the end of the day the island's northern lowlands and southern promontories. The defenders and local populace fled to the hills that made up the island's center, with the Dutch forces in hot pursuit. By the end of 12 March, the Dutch occupied the whole island, suffering 6 killed and 27 wounded.

=== Temporary peace ===
After the Dutch initial success, Lontor's upper class (the orang kaya) sought peace. They offered gifts to Coen and accepted all of the Dutch demands. They agreed to surrender their weapons, destroy their fortifications, and release any hostages they had captured. They accepted the VOC's sovereignty and the construction of several Dutch fortresses on the island, promised to pay a portion of their spice harvest, and sell the remainder exclusively to the Dutch at a fixed price. In exchange, the Dutch agreed to give the natives personal freedom, autonomy and the right to keep practicing Islam.

=== Resumption of hostilities and massacre ===
As peace was agreed between the orang kaya and the Dutch, most of the islanders fled to the hills and began to engage in skirmishes with the Dutch. Coen responded by razing villages and forcing their inhabitants to work for the Dutch.

On 21 April, by means of torture, the Dutch extracted confessions from the orang kaya about a conspiracy against them. Coen captured at least 789 orang kaya along with their family members and deported them to Batavia, where many were enslaved. Having been accused of breaking the treaty and conspiring against the Dutch, 24 orang kaya were sentenced to death and decapitated by Japanese mercenaries on 8 May. The executions did not quell native resistance, however, so Coen ordered his troops to sweep the island and to destroy its villages in order to force the surrender of the population. The next few months the Dutch and the natives were engaged in fierce fighting. Witnessing the destruction caused by the Dutch, many natives chose to die of starvation or from jumping off the cliffs rather than surrender.

== Aftermath ==
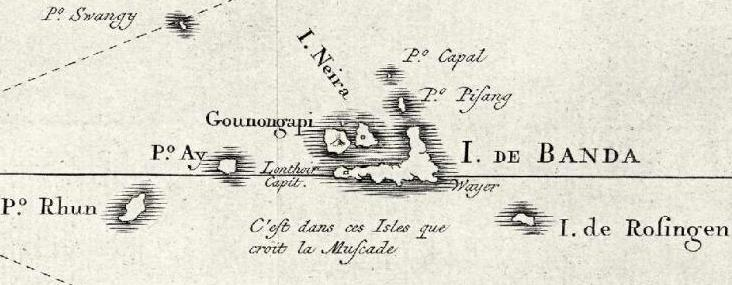
Excerpt of a 1753 Dutch map of Banda, with a note in French: 'It is on these Isles that the Nutmeg grows.'

According to Coen, "about 2,500" inhabitants died "of hunger and misery or by the sword", "a good party of woman and children" were taken, and not more than 300 escaped. Hans Straver concluded that the Lontorese population would have been around 4,500–5,000 people, 50 to 100 of whom died during the fighting, 1,700 of whom were enslaved and 2,500 of whom died due to famine and disease, while an unknown number of natives jumped to their deaths from the cliffs; several hundreds escaped to nearby islands such as the Kei Islands and eastern Seram, their regional trading partners, that welcomed the survivors.

After the campaign, the Dutch controlled virtually all of the Banda Islands. The English had already abandoned Run, and had an only intermittent presence on Nailaka. By signing the 1667 Treaty of Breda, the English formally relinquished their claim to the islands. The islands were severely depopulated as a result of the campaign. American historians Vincent Loth and Charles Corn estimated that the entire population of the Banda Islands before the conquest had been around 15,000 people, of whom only 1,000 survived the conquest including those who lived in or fled to the English-controlled islands of Ai and Run. Peter Lape estimated that 90% of the population was killed, enslaved or deported during the conquest.

To keep the archipelago productive, the Dutch repopulated the islands, mostly with slaves taken from the Dutch East Indies, India and China, working under command of Dutch planters (perkeniers). The original natives were also enslaved and were ordered to teach the new arrivals about nutmeg and mace production. The treatment of the slaves was severe—the native Bandanese population dropped to 100 by 1681, and 200 slaves were imported annually to keep the slave population at a total of 4,000. Although the Dutch did not regard the Christianisation of their slaves as a priority, they forced all Europeans on the Banda Islands to convert and adhere to the Dutch Reformed Church (a form of Calvinist Christianity), while Catholicism (introduced by Portuguese Jesuits in the 16th century) was forbidden and all Catholics forcibly converted. The slave population (consisting of surviving natives and imported slaves) was allowed to practice Islam or animistic faiths, but also encouraged and sometimes forcibly coerced to join the Reformed Church.
