= Lontor =

Lontor may refer to:

- Lontor (island), an Indonesian island
- Lontor (village), a village on the island

== See also ==
- Lontar (disambiguation)
