= Gunung Api =

Gunung Api may refer to:

- Api Siau, a cone volcano on the island of Siau, Sangihe Islands
- Banda Api or Gunung Api, an island volcano in the Banda Islands
- Sangeang Api, an active complex volcano on the island of Sangeang
- Mount Api, a limestone mountain in Sarawak, Borneo
