= Lontar =

Lontar may refer to:

- Lontar, a type of palm-leaf manuscript from Indonesia
  - Lontara, the palm-leaf manuscripts of the Buginese people of Sulawesi
- Borassus flabellifer, a palm known in Indonesian as lontar
- Lontar Island, an Indonesian island
- Lontar Foundation

== See also ==
- Lontara alphabet, a scripts used for some languages of Sulawesi, Indonesia
- Lontor (disambiguation)
- Lotar (disambiguation)
