= Lonthoir =

- Village
- Country: Indonesia
- Province: Maluku
- Regency: Central Maluku
- District: Banda
- Time zone: UTC+9 (IWST)
- Website: https://www.lonthoir.desa.id/

Lonthoir (English pronunciation: /ˈlɒntɔːr/) is a village on the island of Banda Besar (historically also known as Lonthoir), one of the Banda Islands in Indonesia.
