= Banda Api =

Volcano in Maluku

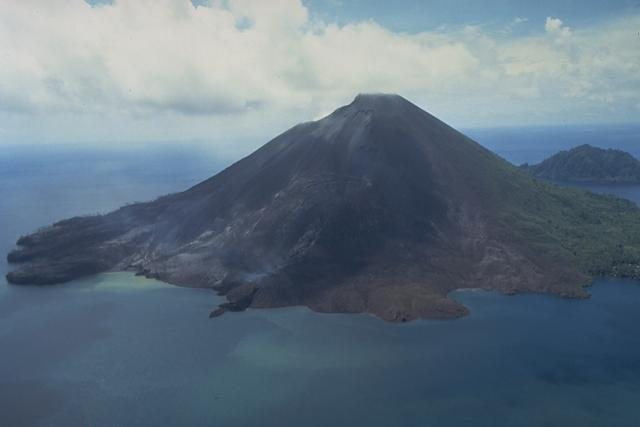
- Banda Api

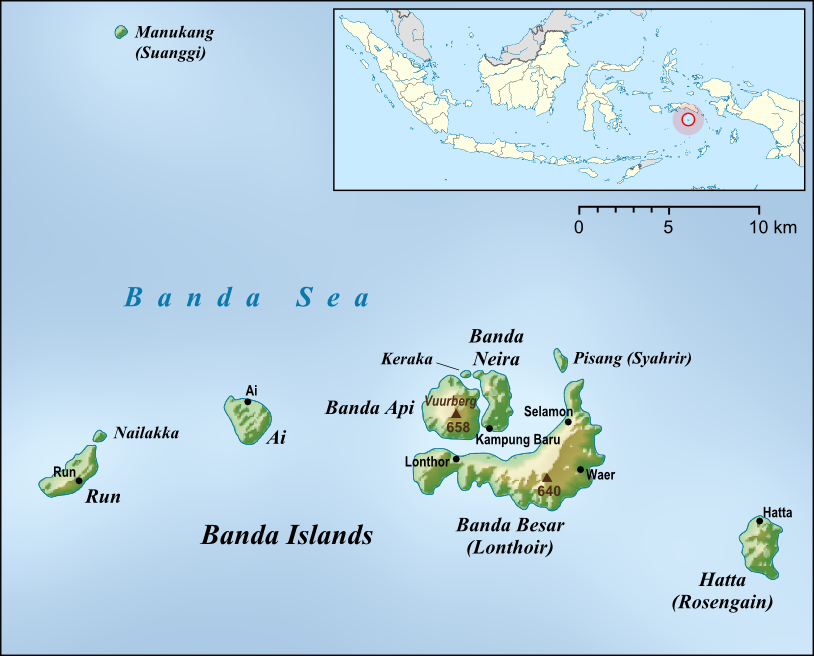
- Map of Banda Islands

- Location in Indonesia

Geography
- Location: Banda Sea
- Coordinates: 4°31′30″S 129°52′17″E
- Archipelago: Banda Islands
- Length: 3 km (1.9 mi)
- Width: 3 km (1.9 mi)
- Highest elevation: 640 m (2100 ft)
- Highest point: Gunung Api

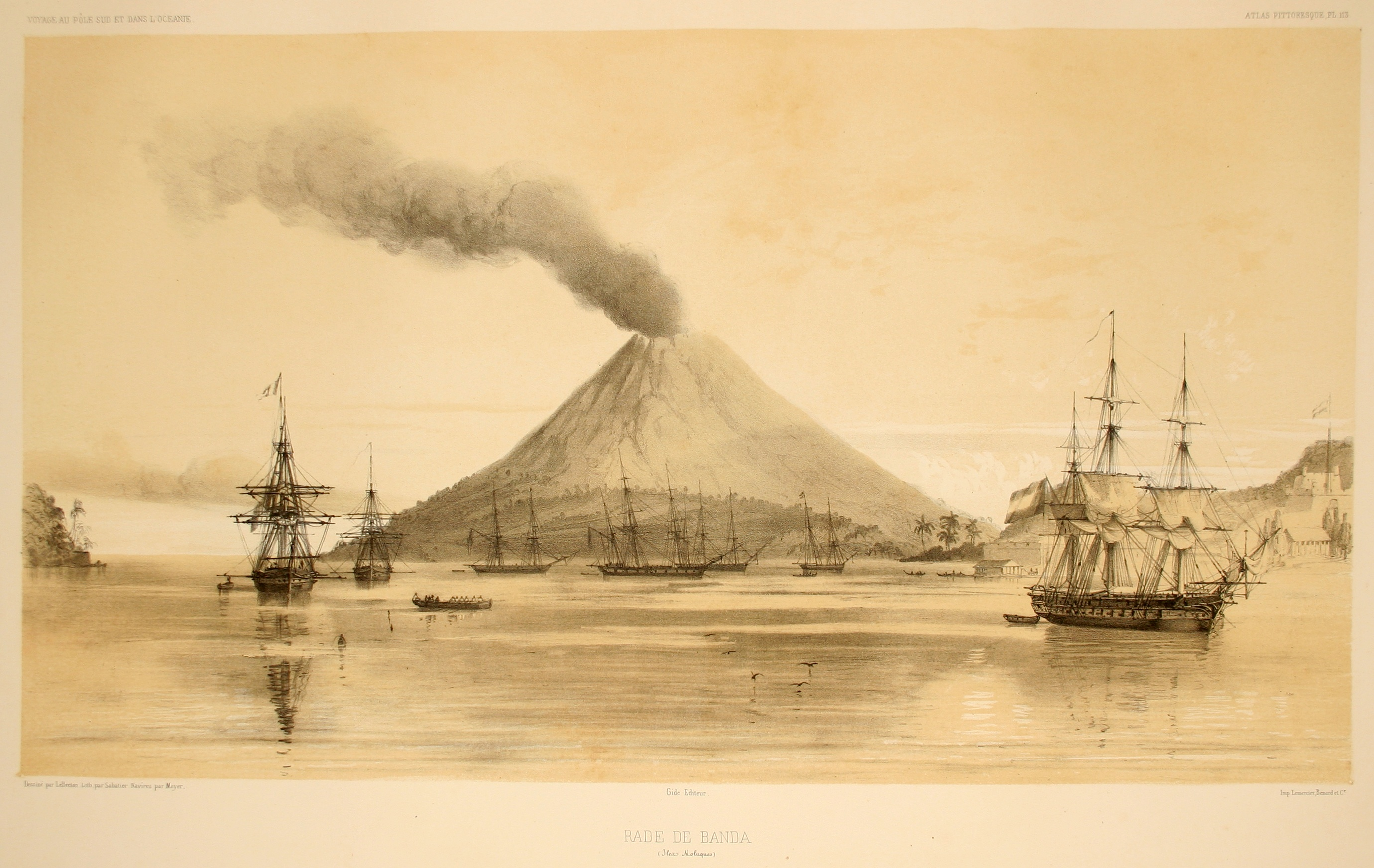
Banda Api in 1846

Banda Api (Indonesian api, fire) is an island in the Banda Islands, Indonesia. It is administered as part of the administrative district (kecamatan) within the Central Maluku Regency in the province of Maluku.

== Geography ==
The island is almost circular and has a diameter of about 3 kilometres (1.9 mi). The island is at the center of the Banda Islands group, with the neighboring island of Banda Neira is around 100 metres east, and Lontor is around 1 km to the south. The island is dominated by its active volcano, Gunung Api or Vuurberg, with a height of 640 metres (2,100 ft). Banda Api and Banda Neira lie at the centre and Lonthoir forms the surviving part of the rim of a submerged caldera with a diameter of around seven kilometres.

== History ==
Nutmeg is grown on the island and trade brought the inhabitants great wealth in the premodern period. Until the early 17th century, the Banda Islands were ruled by locals magnates called the Orang Kaya. The Portuguese were the first Europeans to attempt to dominate the spice trade from the 16th century, but were replaced by the Dutch. Initially, the Dutch established friendly relations and a trading outpost in 1599, but in 1609 the Orang Kaya on Banda Neira rebelled against Dutch attempts to coerce a monopoly on the spice trade, killing 30 Netherlanders. This resulted in a brutal campaign against the people of Banda Islands by the Dutch. The Dutch conquest of the Banda Islands cumulated with the Banda Massacre of 1621, in which Jan Pieterszoon Coen, invaded the islands and subsequently began a campaign to commit genocide against the local inhabitants.

To keep the archipelago productive, the VOC repopulated the islands (including Api), mostly with slaves taken from the rest of modern-day Indonesia, India, the coast of China, working under command of Dutch planters (perkeniers). The original natives were also enslaved and were ordered to teach the newcomers about nutmeg and mace agriculture. The treatment of the slaves was severe—the native Bandanese population dropped to one hundred by 1681, and 200 slaves were imported annually to keep the slave population steady at 4,000.

Volcanic eruptions of Gunung Api were sometimes explosive; several lava flows reached the coast. Between 1586 and 1988 the volcano erupted over twenty times. For example, there was a sudden and violent eruption in June 1820, as a result of which the islanders fled to Banda Neira. Accompanied by underground rumbling, a new crater was built in 1890; at the same time there was a series of earthquakes in which many houses were damaged. In May 1901, strong earthquakes were accompanied by detonations and a bright glow at the top of the volcano.

The Dutch continued to rule the island until 1949, although the economic importance of nutmeg and mace declined greatly due to the loss of the Dutch monopoly after the British successfully planted nutmeg trees in other parts of the world (especially Penang and Grenada) following the Invasion of the Spice Islands in the Napoleonic Wars in 1810. Following Indonesian independence, the island has been administered as part of the Indonesian province of Maluku.

Banda Api erupted on May 10, 1988, from a N-SSW-trending fissure that cut across the island, with both explosive activity and lava effusion occurring. The height of the eruption pillar was estimated at 3 to 5 kilometers on May 9; satellite measurements indicate an altitude of over 16 kilometers. To the south, north, and northwest of the summit, three craters formed, from which lava flows emerged that all reached the sea. The 1,800 islanders as well as 5,000 of the then 6,000 or so residents of the island of Banda Neira were evacuated to Ambon, some 200 kilometers away. Three people died as a result of the volcanic eruptions and most of the inhabitants chose to relocate to Banda Neira.

== See also ==
- Dutch conquest of the Banda Islands (1621)
