= Fort Belgica =

Coordinates: 4°31′34″S 129°53′56″E

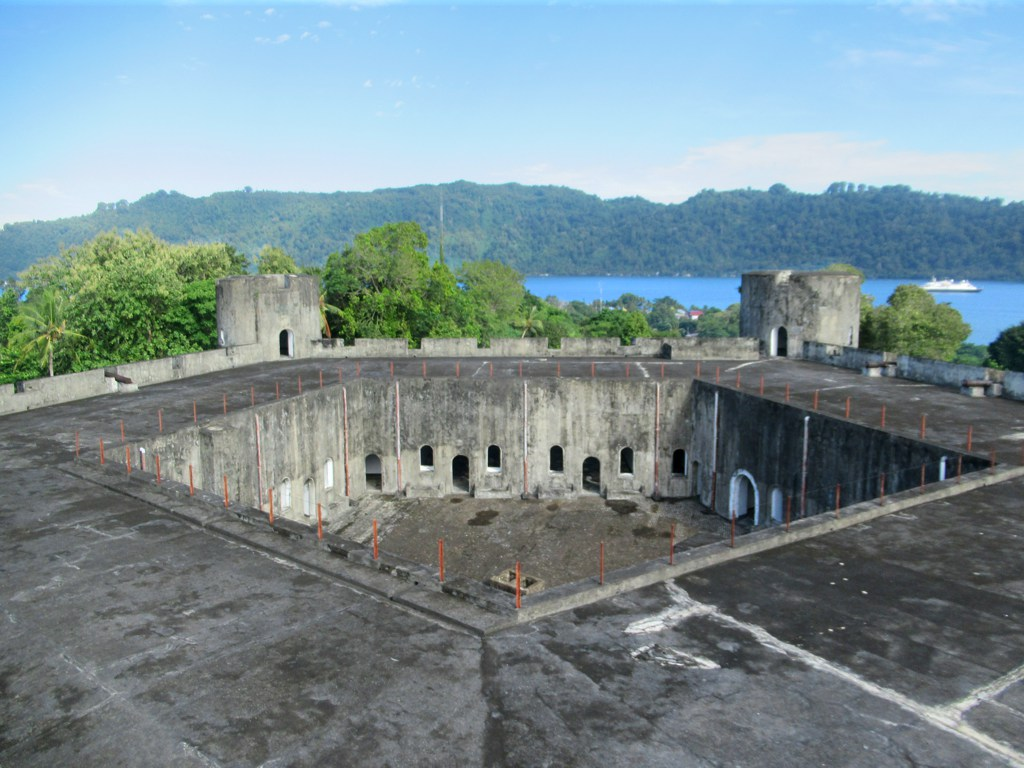
- Fort Belgica in Banda Neira
- Interactive map of the Fort Belgica area

General information
- Architectural style: Dutch colonial
- Location: Banda Neira
- Construction started: 1611

Fort Belgica is a 17th-century fort in Banda Neira, Banda Islands, Maluku Islands (the Moluccas), Indonesia; administratively in Central Maluku Regency, Maluku. The fort acted as a fortification system for the islands of Banda which was the only place in the world during that period where nutmeg was produced.

== History ==
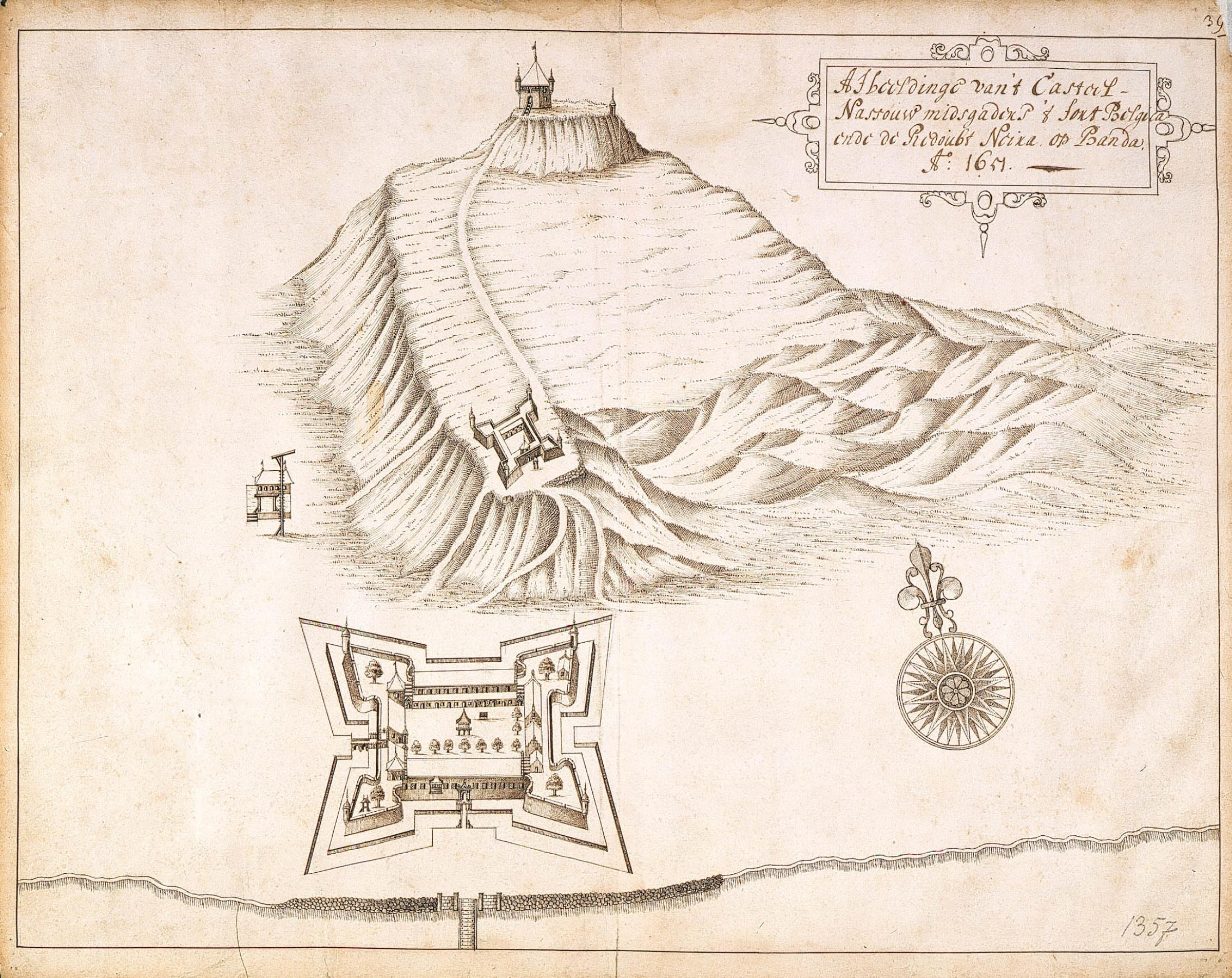
The modest early Fort Belgica on top of a hill, overlooking the Fort Nassau below.

Before Fort Belgica, there was a 16th-century Portuguese fort standing on a hill in Banda Neira. On September 4, 1611, Pieter Both, the first Governor-General of the Dutch East Indies, instructed the construction of a new fort to fortify the hill which dominated the original Dutch fortress, Fort Nassau. This fort was to be named either Belgica or Nederland, and it became Fort Belgica. Fort Belgica was a modest square fort on top of a hill. In 1662, Jan Pieterszoon Coen ordered the renovation of the original fort, so it was replaced with a more solid redoubt that could accommodate 40 men.

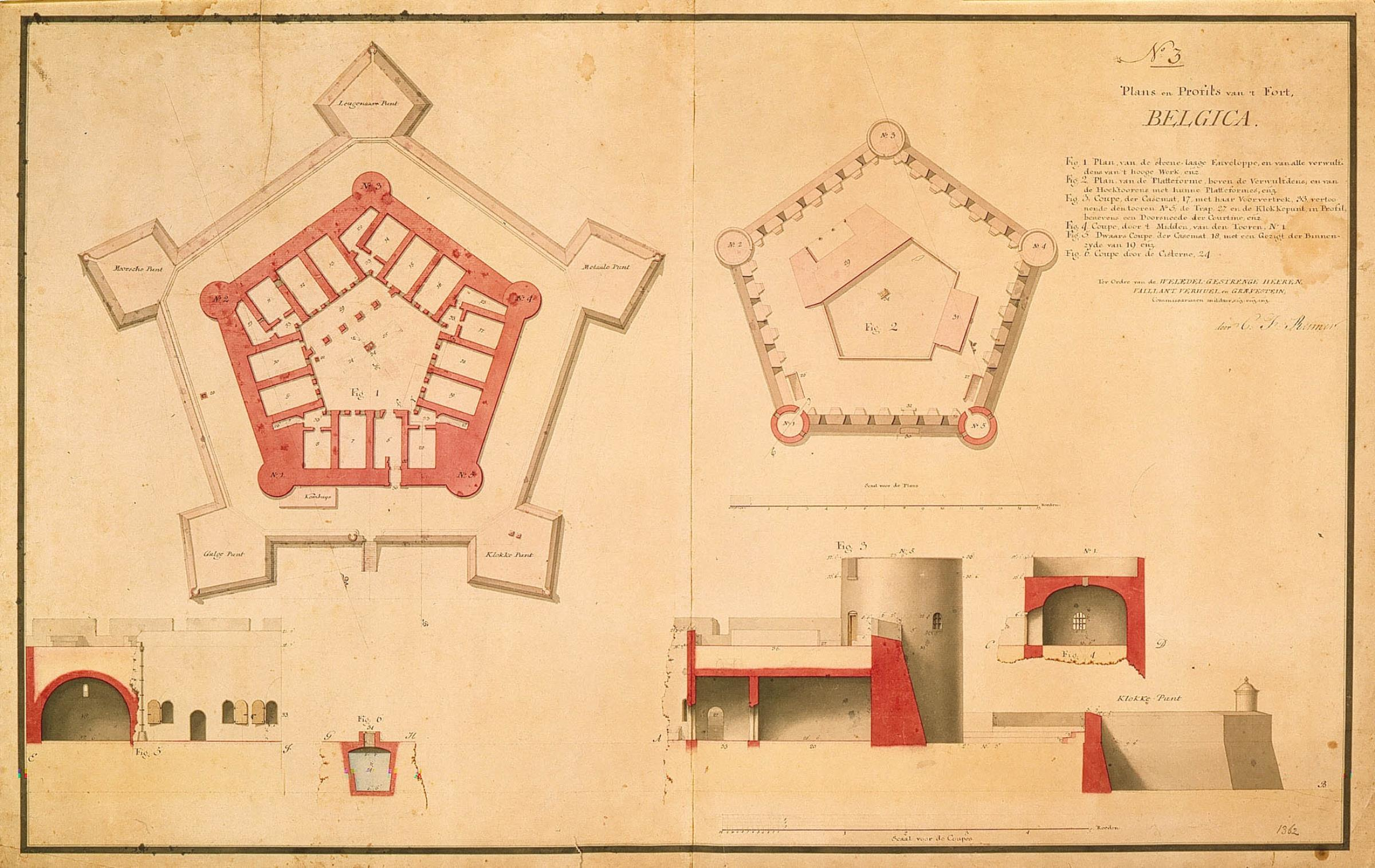
Newer design of Fort Belgica features a pentagonal shape

By the mid-seventeenth century earthquakes, the tropical monsoonal climate, and poor original construction materials and techniques had resulted in the structure becoming dilapidated. In 1667, Governor Cornelis Speelman instructed Engineer Adriaan de Leeuw to redesign and reconstruct the fort. The result was the present "castle", the major modification works started in 1672 and was completed by 1673. The new Fort Belgica was built from stone shipped to the island. The new design consisted of a low outer pentagonal structure with five angled corner bastions and a higher inner pentagon with five tall circular towers. It is the only fort of this kind throughout the Banda Islands.

Despite over 300,000 guilders spent on the modifications, an armament of 50 guns and a garrison of 400 men Fort Belgica surrendered to a British fleet in 1796 without a shot fired. Returned to Dutch control in 1803, it was again taken by the British in 1810, when it was stormed by a naval force under Captain Christopher Cole.

Partially demolished in 1904, it was incompletely rebuilt in 1919. In 1991, following the order of General Benny Moerdani, at the time the Minister of Defense and Security of Indonesia, the fort was thoroughly restored.

== Layout ==
Fort Belgica sits on top of a hill on the southwestern part of the island Banda Neira. The fort overlooks Fort Nassau, lower on the foot of the hill to the south.

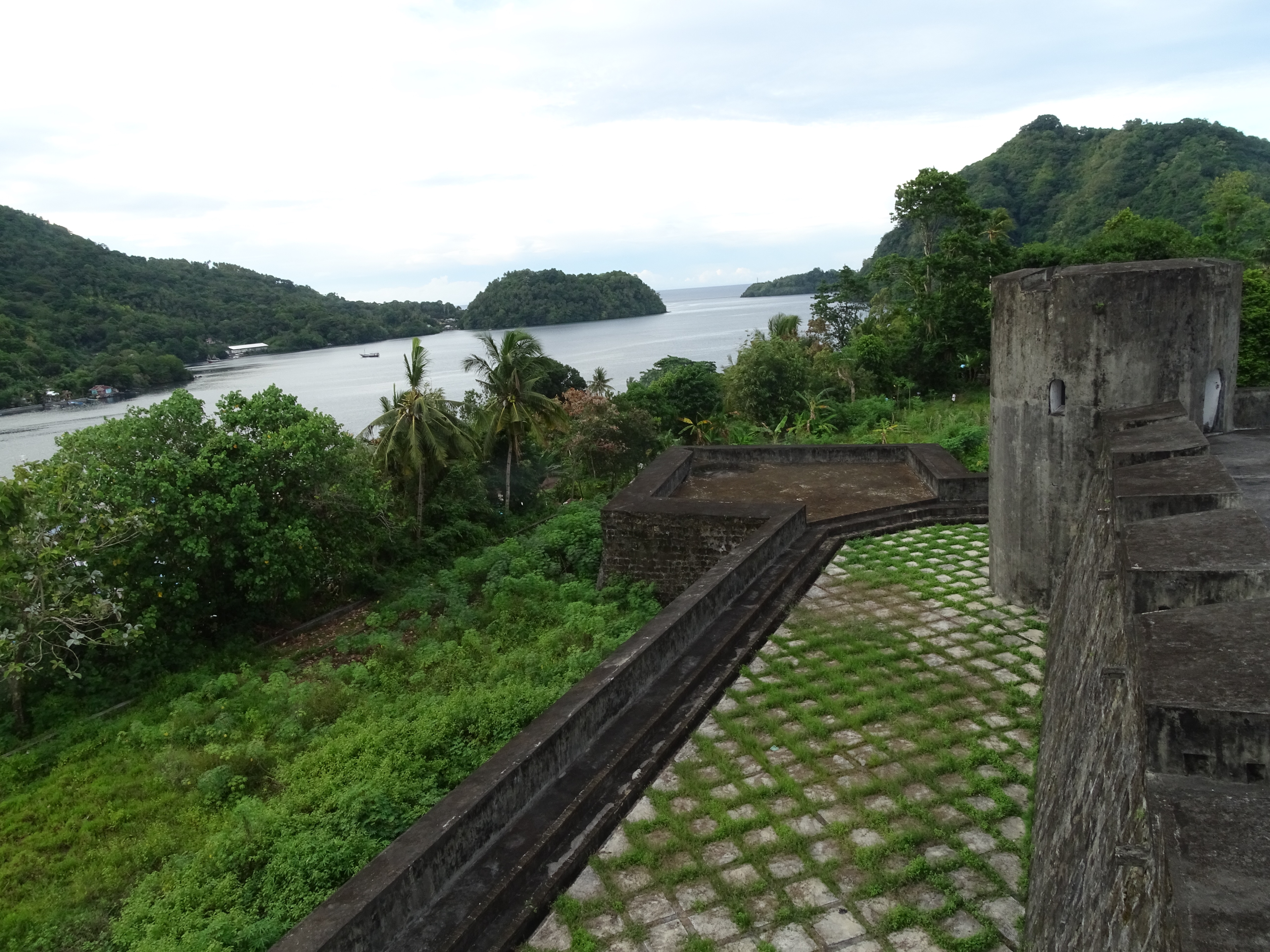
Pentagonal Structures in Fort Belgica

Fort Belgica is pentagonal in form. It consists of a low outer pentagonal structure and a higher inner pentagonal structure. A stairs access on the southernmost wall of the outer pentagon provides the sole point of entry to the fort. The lower pentagonal structure is equipped with five bastions, from the left-hand side of the access point: Galge punt, Moorsche punt, Leugenaar punt, Metaale punt, and Klokke punt, each equipped with a bartizan. The higher inner pentagonal structure housed several rooms which were arranged surrounding a pentagonal-shaped inner courtyard. Stairs in one of these rooms provide access to the top level.

== World Heritage Status ==
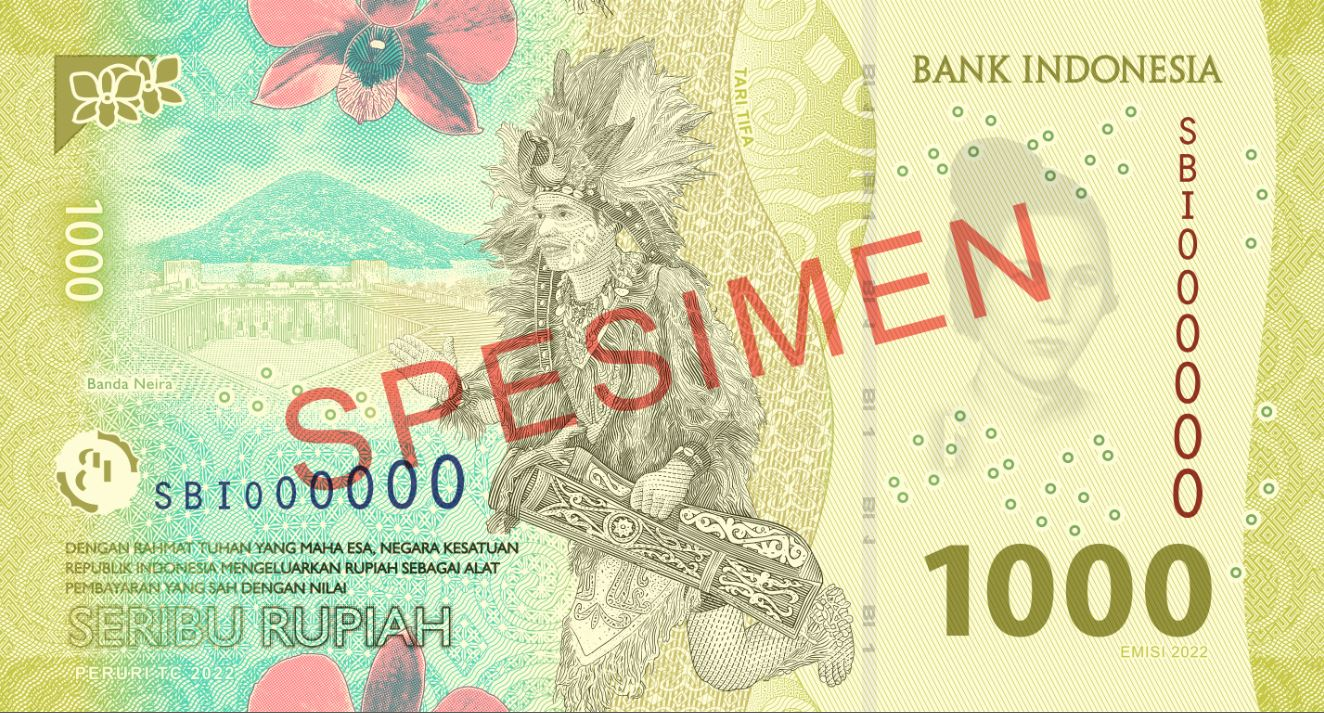
Banda Neira featured on the reverse of the 1,000 rupiah banknote

In January 2015, Belgica Fort was added to the UNESCO World Heritage Tentative List as part of the Historic and Marine Landscape of the Banda Islands.

== Citations ==
=== Bibliography ===
- Gagas Ulung (2011). Extremely Beautiful Maluku. Backpacking and Traveling (in Indonesian). Jakarta: Gramedia Pustaka Utama. ISBN 9789792268089.
- Groll, Coenraad Liebrecht Temminck (2002). Dutch overseas: architectural survey: mutual heritage of four centuries in three continents. Cultuurhistorische studies (illustrated ed.). Waanders. ISBN 9789040087431.
- Hanna, Willard Anderson (1991). Indonesian Banda: Colonialism and Its Aftermath in the Nutmeg Islands. Yayasan Warisan dan Budaya Banda Naira.
- "The Historic and Marine Landscape of the Banda Islands". UNESCO. 2015.
- van de Wall, V.I. (1928). De Nederlandsche Oudheden in de Molukken [Dutch Antiquities in the Moluccans] (in Dutch). 's-Gravenhage: Martinus Nijhoff.
