= Fort Nassau, Banda Islands =

Coordinates: 4.5282°S 129.8977°E

Fort Nassau
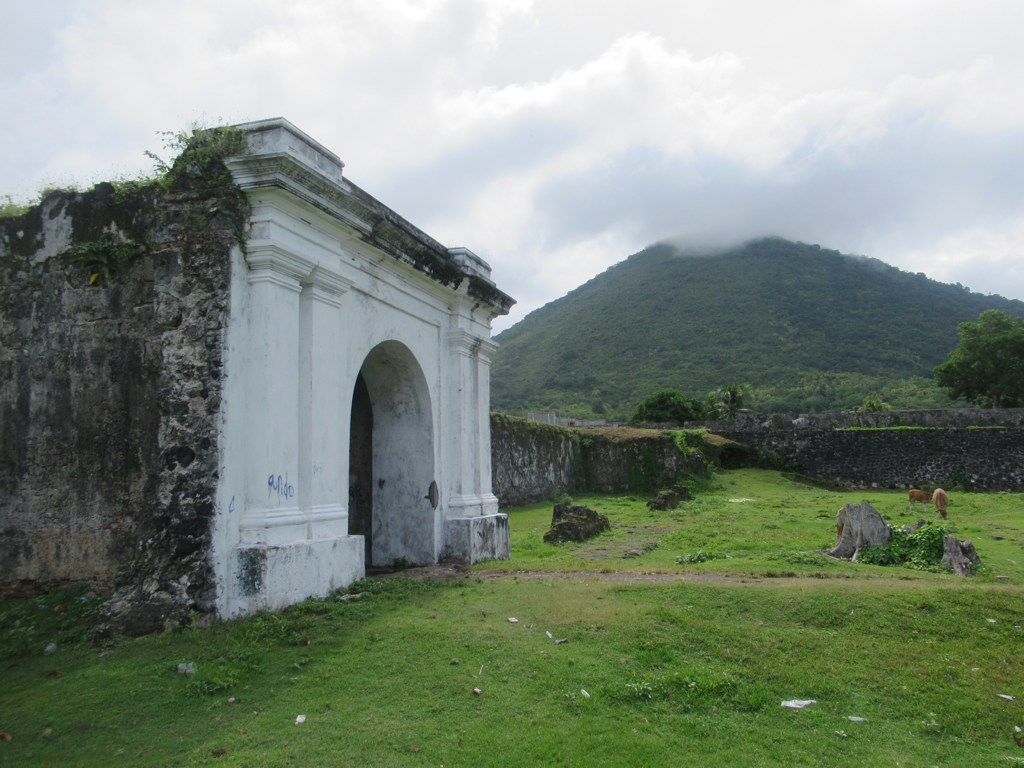
- Interactive map of the Fort Nassau area

General information
- Architectural style: Dutch colonial
- Location: Banda Neira
- Completed: 1609

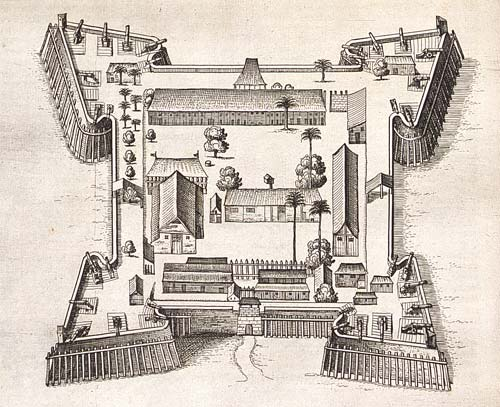
Fort Nassau, from 1609, was the first Dutch fort built in the Banda Islands

Fort Nassau was the first Dutch fort built on Banda Neira Island, the main island of the Banda Islands, part of Maluku in Indonesia, completed in 1609. Its purpose was to control the trade in nutmeg, which at that time was only grown in the Banda Islands.

The Portuguese had previously attempted to build a fort in this location in 1529 but, after constructing the foundations, they abandoned the work due to hostility from the Bandanese people.

On 25 April 1609, the Dutch fleet commander, Admiral Verhoeven, sent 750 soldiers ashore to commence their fort, choosing the Portuguese foundations as the location. The Bandanese, threatened by the new fort and the strength of the Dutch presence, and opposed to the Dutch plan to monopolise the Bandanese nutmeg industry attacked the Dutch, killing Admiral Verhoeven and 40 of his men.

The Dutch hurried the fort to completion, and it served as their principal administrative and military base in the Bandas, later supplemented by other forts on Banda Besar, Forts Hollandia and Concordia, and Ai, Fort Revenge.

Fort Nassau was a large four-bastioned quadrilateral structure, located by the channel between Banda and Banda Besar Islands. Today Fort Nassau is overlooked by the more impressive Fort Belgica. It is currently damaged and dilapidated, but two bastions and substantial walls can still be seen.

== See also ==
- List of forts
