= Run (island) =

Island in Maluku Province, Indonesia

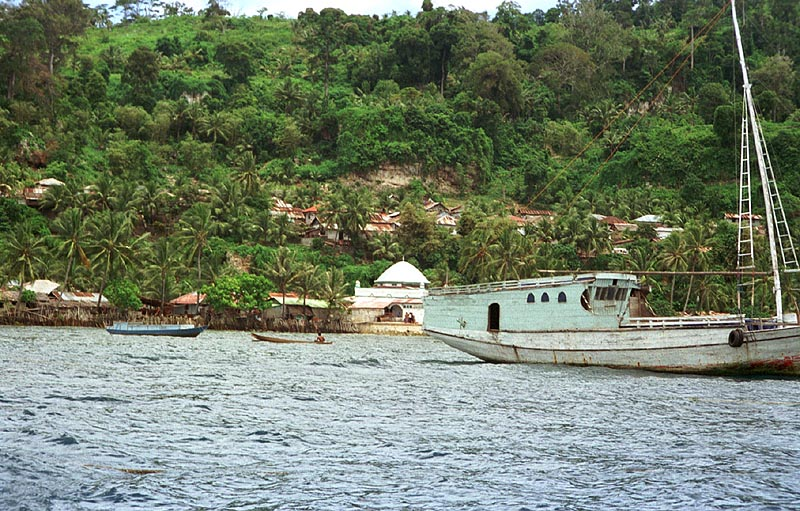
- A view of the coast

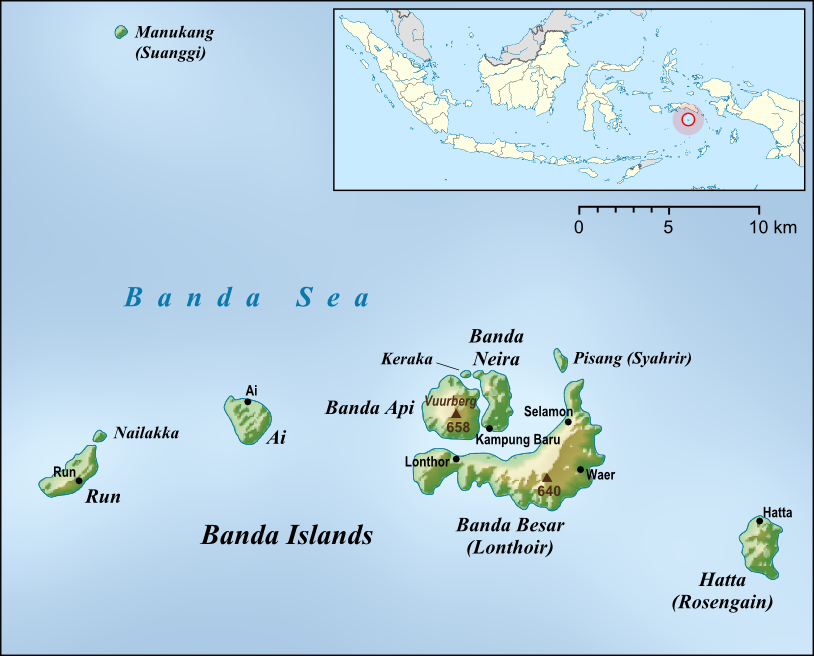
- Run in the west of the Banda Islands

Geography
- Location: Oceania
- Coordinates: 4°33′25.87″S 129°41′01.63″E
- Archipelago: Maluku Islands
- Area: 13.16 km^{2} (5.08 sq mi)

Administration
- Indonesia
- Province: Maluku
- Regency: Central Maluku

Demographics
- Population: 1,572 (mid 2022)
- Pop. density: 119.5/km^{2} (309.5/sq mi)

Additional information
- Time zone: IEST (UTC+09:00)

Run (also known as Pulau Run, Pulo Run, Puloroon, Polo or Rhun – pulau is 'island' in Indonesian) is one of the smallest islands of the Banda Islands, which are a part of the Moluccas, Indonesia. It is located within Banda District (kecamatan) in Central Maluku Regency.

In 1616, fearing the Dutch, the natives of the island pledged their allegiance to the employees of English East India Company, who accepted it on behalf of the Crown. According to historian John Keay who considers Pulo Run as the genesis of the British Empire: "As the island of Runnymede is to British constitutional history, so the island of Run is to British imperial history". In the 17th century, the tiny island of Run was of great economic importance because of the value of the spices it produced: nutmeg and mace.

== Geography ==
Run is the westernmost island of the Banda Islands, with a length of 3 kilometres (1.9 mi) and width of 1 kilometre (0.62 mi). The neighbouring island of Pulau Ay is about 7 km east and the small islet of Pulau Naijalaka is 0.7 km north.

== History ==
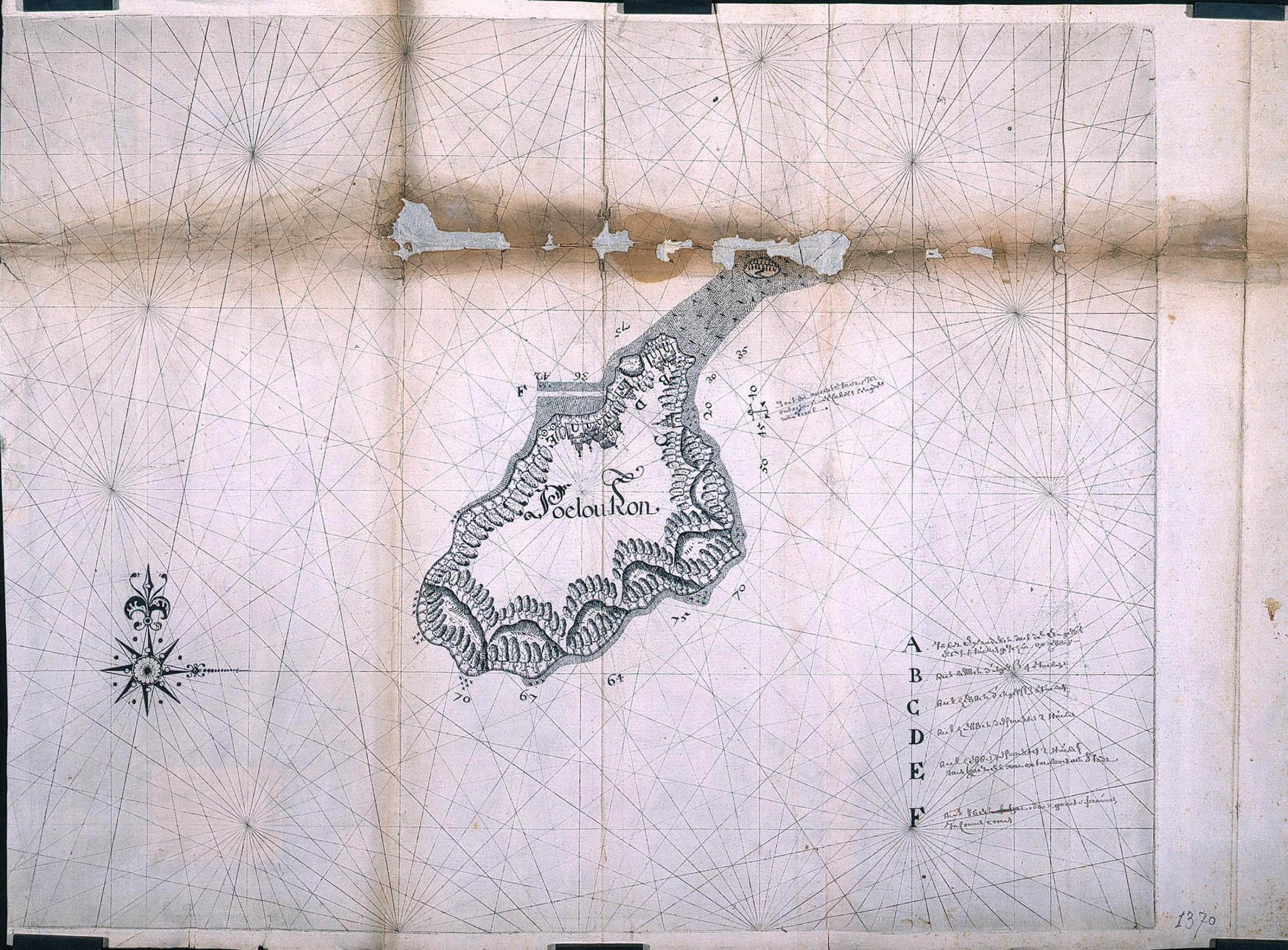
Map of Run Island dated 1623

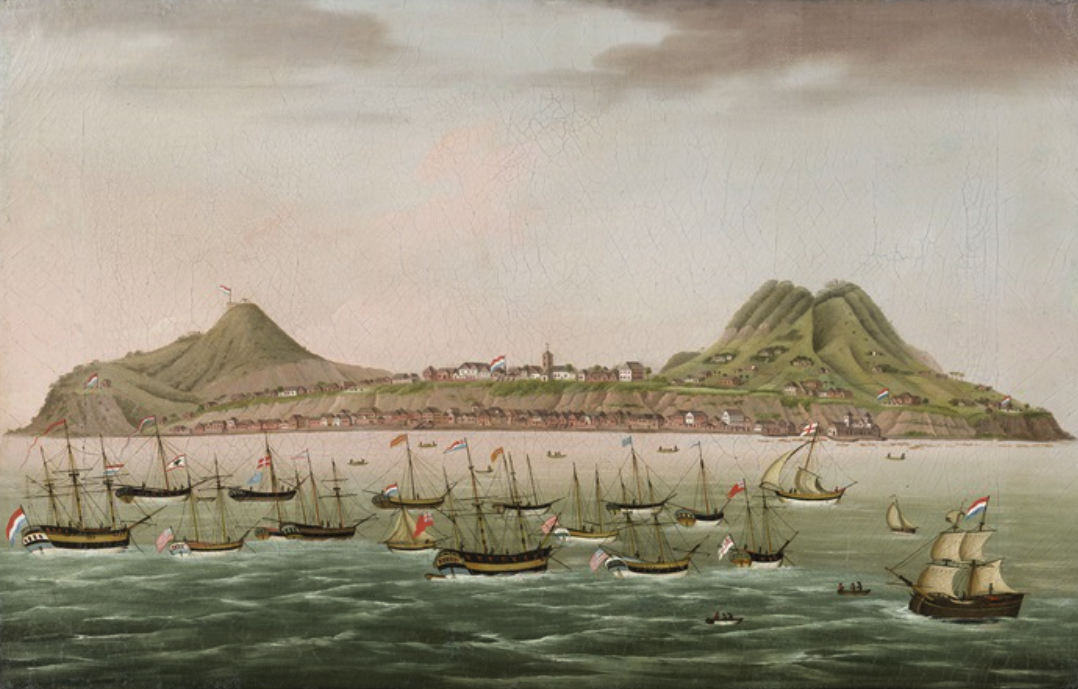
Pulau Run c. 1790

During the history of the spice trade, sailors of the English East India Company of the first expedition of James Lancaster, had reached the East Indies in 1602 They included the likes of John Davis, Sir Henry Middleton and his brother John who stayed in Bantam on Java. From there they organised and sent a small team which reached the island in 1603 and developed good contacts with the inhabitants. A small settlement was first attempted on the islet of Pulau Naijalaka off the north end of Pulau Rhun.

On December 25, 1616, Captain Nathaniel Courthope and 1st mate Zachary Barnett Duncan reached Run to defend it against the claims of the Dutch East India Company (VOC). A contract with the inhabitants was signed, accepting James I of England/James VI of Scotland as sovereign of the island. The Dutch were outraged over this threat to their monopoly on the extremely profitable spice trade. Courthope fortified the island by erecting forts to overlook approaches from the east, but lost two ships to mutiny and sinking by the Dutch, when they laid siege to the island. Courthope and 39 European defenders with their native allies held off the Dutch for 1540 days; however, after his death in a Dutch attack in 1620, the English departed the island.

Finally in possession of Run, the Dutch proceeded to kill or enslave all adult men, exile the women and children and chop down every nutmeg tree on the island to prevent the English from retaking it. The VOC only allowed cattle to roam free on Run to provide food for the other islands. It was not until 1638 that the English tried to access Run again, after which VOC officials annually visited the island to check if they had secretly re-established themselves.

According to the Treaty of Westminster ending the First Anglo-Dutch War (1652–1654), Run should have been returned to England.

After the Second Anglo-Dutch War (1665–1667), England and the United Provinces of the Netherlands agreed in the Treaty of Breda to the status quo: the English kept the island of Manhattan, which the Duke of York (the future James II, brother of Charles II), had occupied in 1664, renaming the city on that island from New Amsterdam to New York. In return, Run was formally abandoned to the Dutch. In describing these events, Giles Milton is quoted in his novel Nathaniel's Nutmeg, in reference to Captain Nathaniel Courthope: "Yet the stand that he made on Run was to reshape history on the other side of the world, and although his death robbed England of her nutmeg, it gave her the biggest of apples".

The Dutch monopoly on nutmeg and mace lasted up till the Napoleonic Wars; when in 1810 the British led by Captain Cole invaded and captured the Spice islands. The transfer of nutmeg trees to Ceylon, Grenada, Singapore and other British colonies in 1817 led to the decline of the Dutch supremacy in the spice trade. Dutch control of the island ended in 1949 (as the Dutch East Indies became Indonesia), but nutmeg trees are still growing on Run today.

== Administration ==
Run Island is part of the Banda Islands group which had a total population of 20,924 at the 2020 census. The main town of the group is Banda Naira on Banda Naira Island. Administratively, Run Island is included in the Banda District (kecamatan) which is one of 18 districts within the Central Maluku Regency (population 423,094 at the 2020 census). The Regency is in turn part of the province of Maluku (population 1,848,923 at the 2020 census), the capital city of which is Ambon on Ambon Island.

Banda Naira is connected by sea and air transport to Ambon. Bandanaira airport is one of the smaller airports in Indonesia, used mainly by administrative staff or by tourists who visit Banda Islands for the snorkeling and diving opportunities in the region.

== Education ==
As of 2024 education on the island goes up to the junior high school level. The name of the junior high school is SMP Negeri 82 Maluku Tengah. An elementary school is SD Negeri 72 Maluku Tengah.

== See also ==
- Banda Neira
- British Bencoolen
- Bantam Presidency
