= Willard A. Hanna =

American historian (1911–1993)

Willard Anderson Hanna
- Born: August 3, 1911; Cross Creek, Pennsylvania, U.S.
- Died: October 5, 1993 (aged 82); Hanover, New Hampshire, U.S.
- Spouse: Marybelle Bouchard

Willard Anderson Hanna (August 3, 1911 – October 5, 1993) was an American writer of Southeast Asian history and works of fiction as well as a teacher. Hanna wrote politics, history, and historical fiction. He wrote Bali Chronicles with Adrian Vickers. Hanna co-authored Turbulent Times Past in Ternate and Tidore on the history of the Maluku Islands and Banda Neira with Des Alwi.

== Biography ==
He was from Cross Creek, Pennsylvania, and graduated from the College of Wooster in Wooster, Ohio, in 1932. He traveled to China and taught English for four years in Shanghai and Hangzhou before returning to the United States and achieving a master's degree from Ohio State University in 1937 and a Ph.D. from the University of Michigan in 1939. He joined the Navy in early 1942 and served at the military's Japanese language school at the University of Colorado and then at a military program at Columbia University. He was part of the landings on Okinawa on April 1, 1945 (Battle of Okinawa) as a lieutenant commander, and remained in Okinawa for more than a year. His work there included helping establish schools.

He continued his career at the U.S. State Department for seven years, working in Manila, Tokyo and Jakarta, where he established the United States Information Services offices which he ran until 1952. In Washington, D.C., he graduated from the National War College in 1953 and was deployed to the United States Embassy in Tokyo as an information officer. He resigned from the State Department in 1954 and worked for the American Universities Field Staff in Jakarta, Kuala Lumpur, Singapore and Hong Kong before he retired in 1976.

He married Marybelle Bouchard. Hanna died in Hanover, New Hampshire, on October 5, 1993, at the age of 82.

== Bibliography ==
- Destiny Has Eight Eyes (1941) Harper & Brothers, a novel set in China at the outbreak of World War II
- Bali Profile: People, Events, Circumstances 1001-1976 (Jun 1976)
- The Formation of Malaysia
- Eight Nation Makers
- Indonesian Banda: Colonialism and its aftermath in the Nutmeg Islands (1978)
- The Berkshire-Litchfield legacy: Litchfield, Ancram, Salisbury, Stockbridge, Lenox by (1984)
- Hikayat Jakarta (1988)
- Turbulent times past in Ternate and Tidore (1990)
- Bali Chronicles: A Lively Account of the Island's History from Early Times to the 1970's (Periplus Classics Series) by Willard A. Hanna and Adrian Vickers (November 15, 2004)
