= Banda Besar =

Island in Indonesia

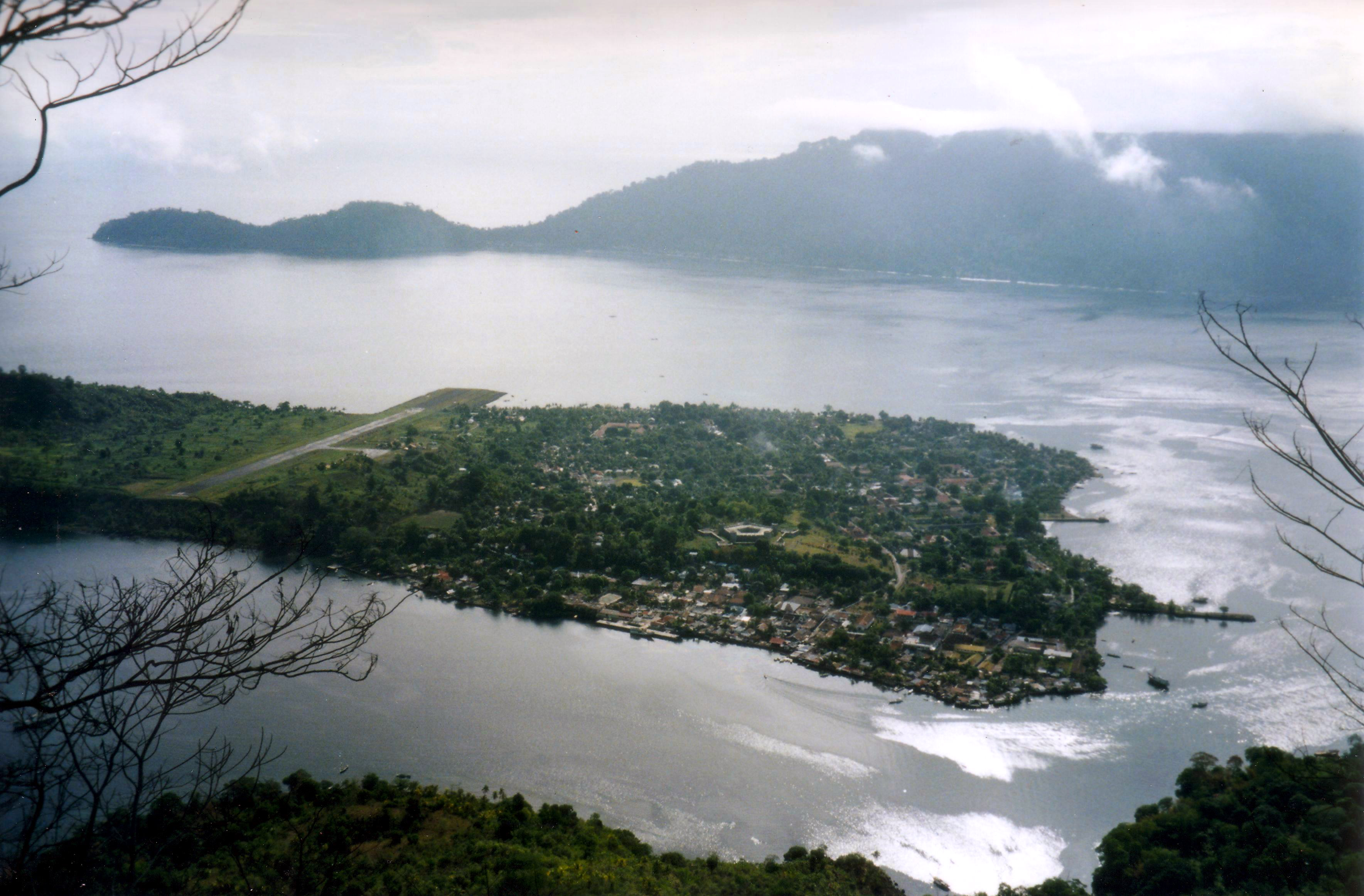
- Banda Neira and Banda Besar seen from Banda Api.

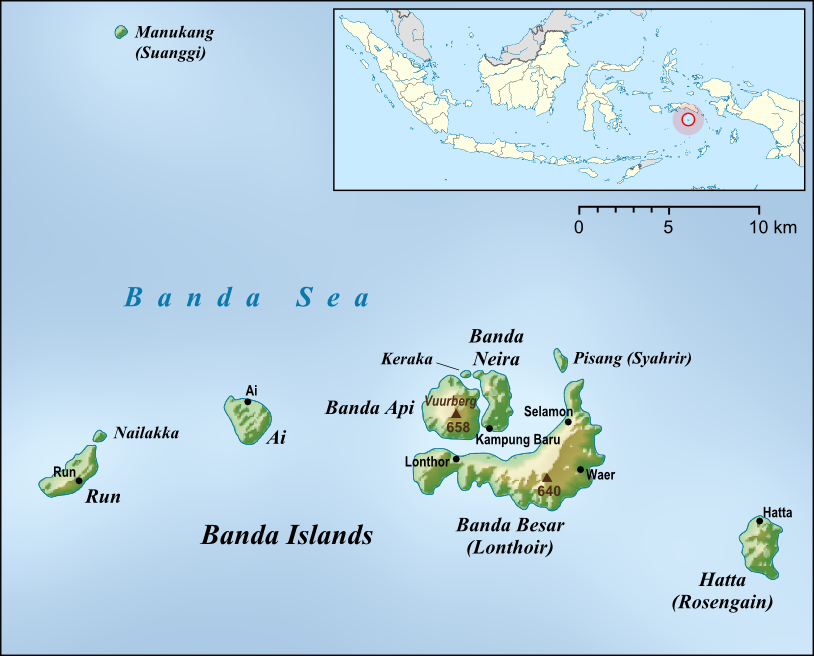
- Map of Banda Islands

- Location in Indonesia

Geography
- Location: Banda Sea
- Coordinates: 4°33′S 129°55′E
- Archipelago: Banda Islands
- Area: 26.37 km^{2} (10.18 sq mi)
- Length: 12 km (7.5 mi)
- Width: 3 km (1.9 mi)

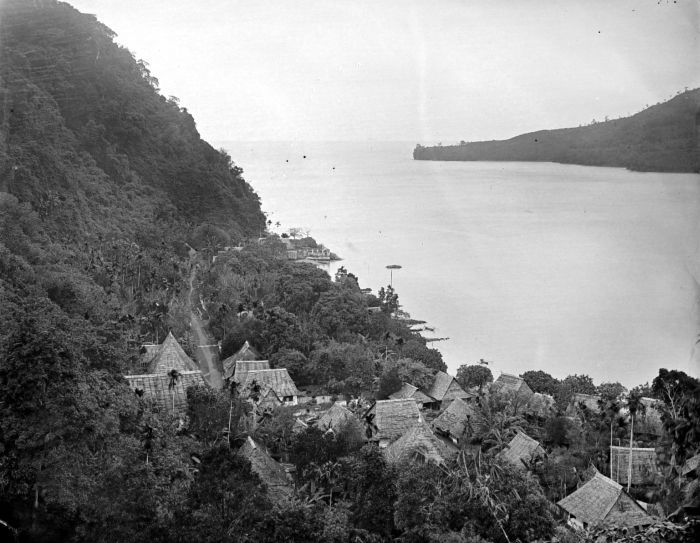
Lonthoir in the early 20th century

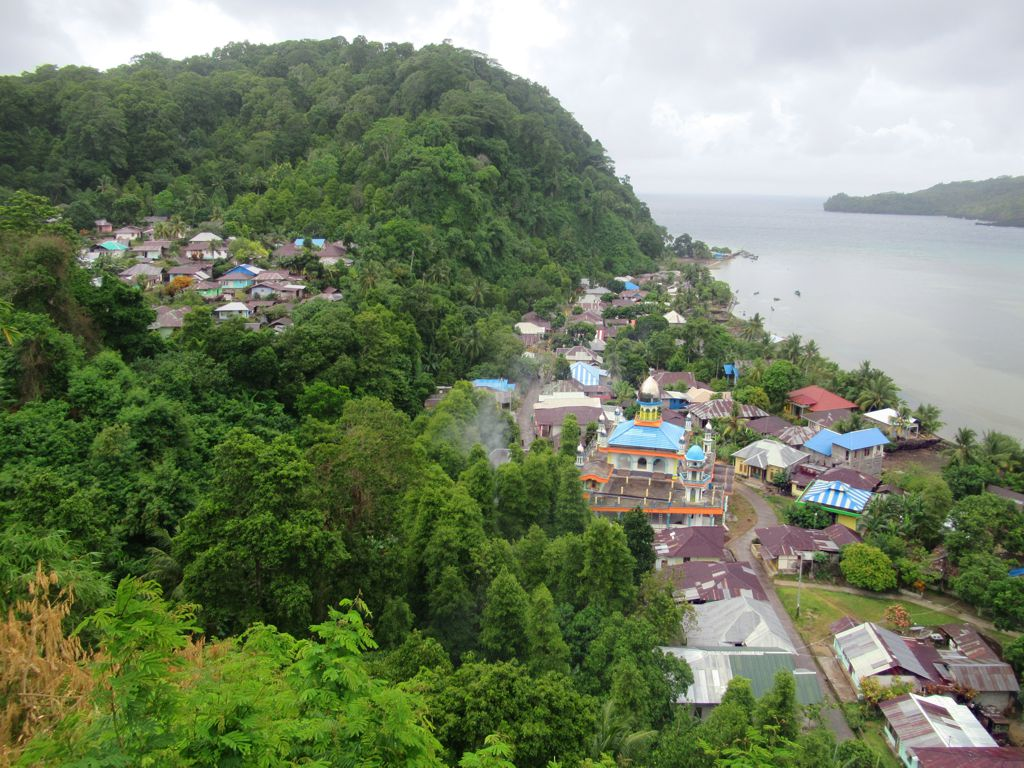
Lonthoir in 2019

Banda Besar (English pronunciation: /ˈbændə bəˈsɑːr/; 'Great Banda', Dutch: Groot-Banda), also known historically as Lonthoir (alternatively spelt Lonthor or Lontor), is the largest of the Banda Islands in Indonesia. It is administered as part of Banda District, Central Maluku Regency, Maluku Province.

== Geography ==
Banda Besar is the largest of the Banda Islands and one of the three central Banda Islands, the others being Banda Neira and Banda Api at 1.5 kilometres (0.93 mi) and 0.8 kilometres (0.50 mi), respectively, to the north. Banda Besar is located on the south side of a submerged caldera with a diameter of around seven kilometers, inside which the islands of Banda Neira and Banda Api are located.

A ridge runs along the length of the island with a maximum height of 510 metres (1,670 ft). The largest settlements are Lonthoir, Selamon and Waer. There are two partially ruined Dutch forts on the island: Benteng Hollandia in Lonthoir and Benteng Concordia in Waer.

== History ==
Nutmeg is grown on the island and trade brought the inhabitants great wealth in the premodern period. Until the early 17th century, the Banda Islands were ruled by local magnates called the Orang Kaya. The Portuguese were the first Europeans to attempt to dominate the spice trade from the 16th century, but were replaced by the Dutch. Initially, the Dutch established friendly relations and a trading outpost in 1599, but in 1609 the Orang Kaya on Banda Neira rebelled against Dutch attempts to coerce a monopoly on the spice trade, killing 30 Netherlanders. This resulted in a brutal campaign against the people of Banda Islands by the Dutch including two punitive military expeditions in early 1611 against Lontor led by Piet Hein. The Dutch conquest of the Banda Islands cumulated with the Banda Massacre of 1621, in which Jan Pieterszoon Coen, with a fleet of 19 ships, 1,655 European troops and 286 Asian auxiliaries, invaded the islands and subsequently began a campaign to commit genocide against the local inhabitants. According to Coen's own account, "about 2,500" inhabitants died "of hunger and misery or by the sword", "a good party of woman and children" were taken, and not more than 300 escaped. Straver (2018) concluded that the Lontorese population would have been around 4,500–5,000 people, 50 to 100 of whom died during the fighting, 1,700 of whom were enslaved and 2,500 of whom died due to famine and disease, while an unknown number of natives jumped to their deaths from the cliffs; several hundreds escaped to nearby islands such as the Kei Islands and eastern Seram.

To keep the archipelago productive, the VOC repopulated the islands (including Banda Besar), mostly with slaves taken from the rest of modern-day Indonesia, India, the coast of China, working under command of Dutch planters (perkeniers). The original natives were also enslaved and were ordered to teach the newcomers about nutmeg and mace agriculture. The treatment of the slaves was severe—the native Bandanese population dropped to one hundred by 1681, and 200 slaves were imported annually to keep the slave population steady at 4,000.

The Dutch continued to rule the island until 1949, although the economic importance of nutmeg and mace declined greatly due to the loss of the Dutch monopoly after the British successfully planted nutmeg trees in other parts of the world (especially Penang and Grenada) following the Invasion of the Spice Islands in the Napoleonic Wars in 1810. Following Indonesian independence, the island has been administered as part of the Indonesian province of Maluku.

== See also ==
- Dutch conquest of the Banda Islands (1621)
