= Reynst family =

The Reynst family coat of arms

The Reijnst family was a family of soldiers and politicians in the Dutch Republic. Their surname was also spelled Reynst or Rijnst. The family played an important role in the Dutch East India Company, the Navy, Amsterdam government and as Art collectors. The family owned the Reynst collection from which the Dutch Gift came.

== History ==
The origins of the family can be found in the 15th century when they were merchants in the city of Amsterdam. After the Alteratie of Amsterdam (1578) the Reynst came into government where the family achieved huge influence and prestige during the Golden Age period. J.C. Reijnst (1798-1871) was given noble status and the rank of jonkheer or jonkvrouw in 1840. This branch became extinct in 1972. Today there are still family members from a non-ennobled branch.

== Family members ==
- Gerard Reynst († 1615), Co-founder of the Dutch East India Company, Governor general of Dutch East Indies
- Gerrit Reynst (1599–1658), member of the Amsterdam Vroedschap, art collector, owner of the Reynst collection from which the Dutch Gift came
- Jan Reynst (1601–1646), merchant, art collect or (Reynst Collection, Dutch Gift)
- Lambert Reynst (1613–1679), burgomaster of Amsterdam
- Jacob Reynst (1685-1756), Vice admiral of Holland and West-Friesland
- Pieter Hendrik Reynst (1723-1791), Vice admiral of Holland and West-Friesland
- Jhr. Joan Cornelis Reynst (1798–1871), acting Governor-General of the Dutch East Indies

== Gallery ==
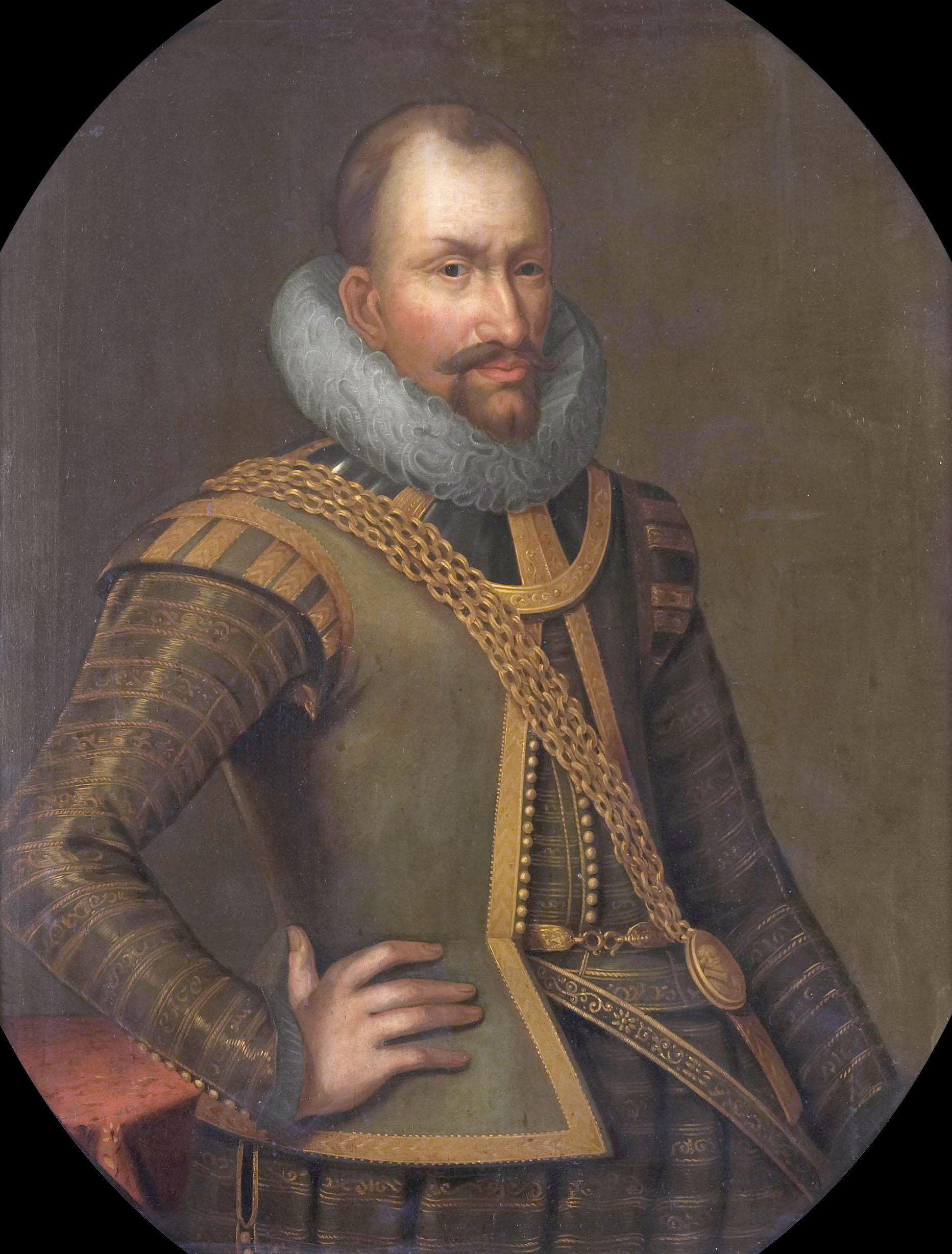
Governor-general Gerard Reynst

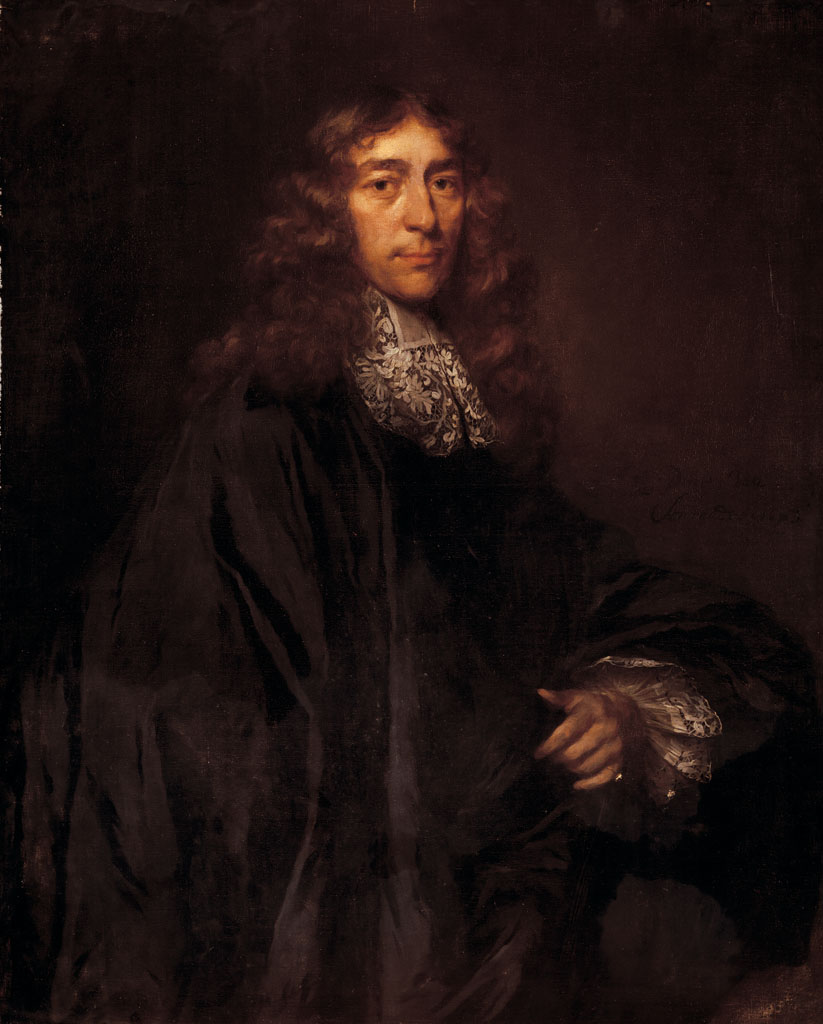
Regent Lambert Reynst, painted by Pieter van Anraedt

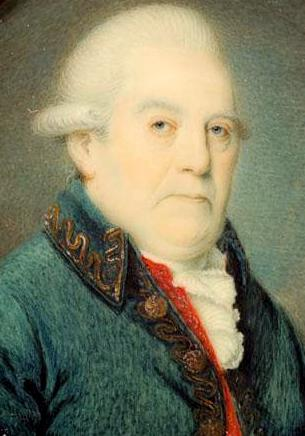
Vice admiral Pieter Hendrik Reijnst

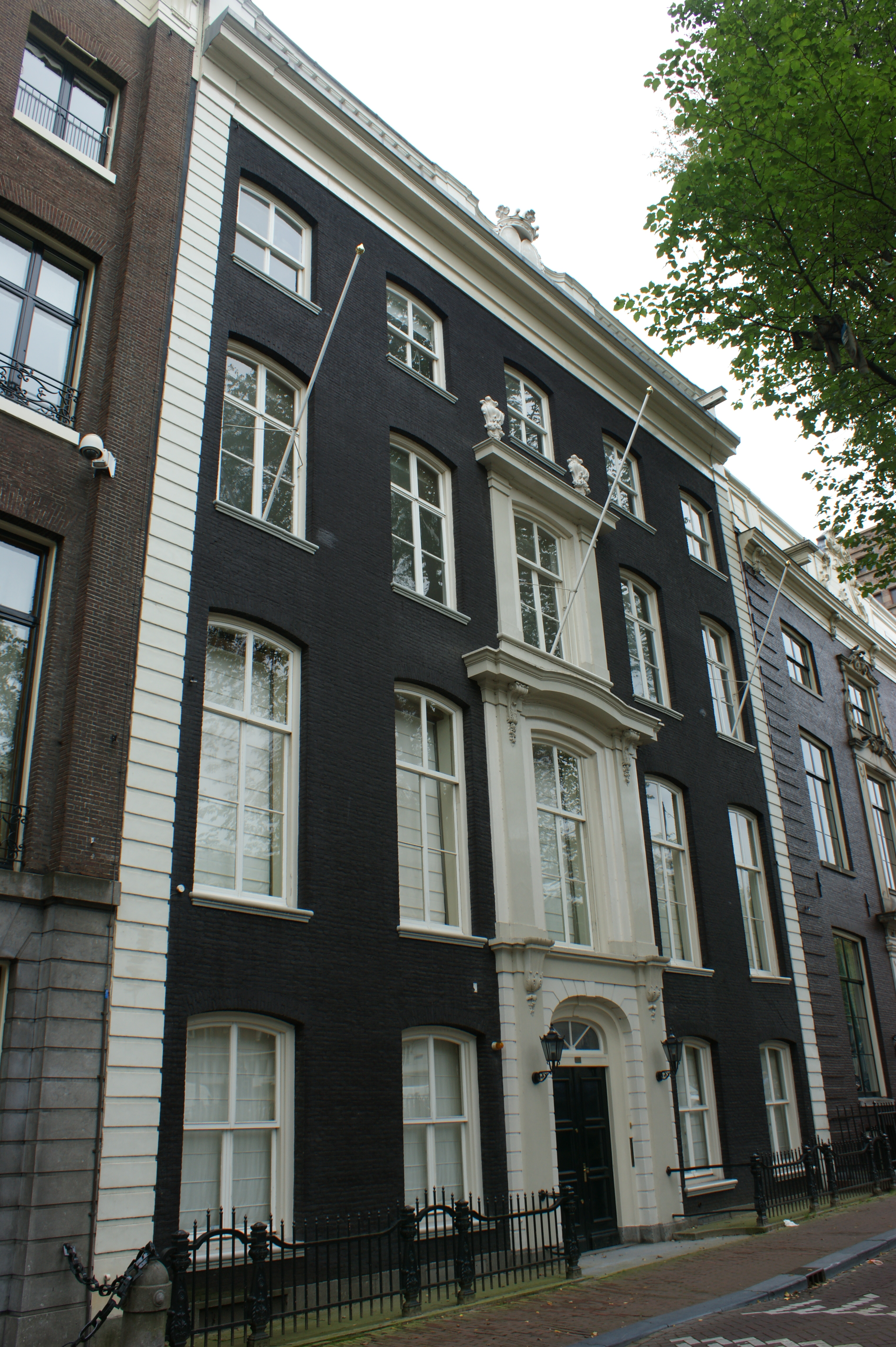
Herengracht 500

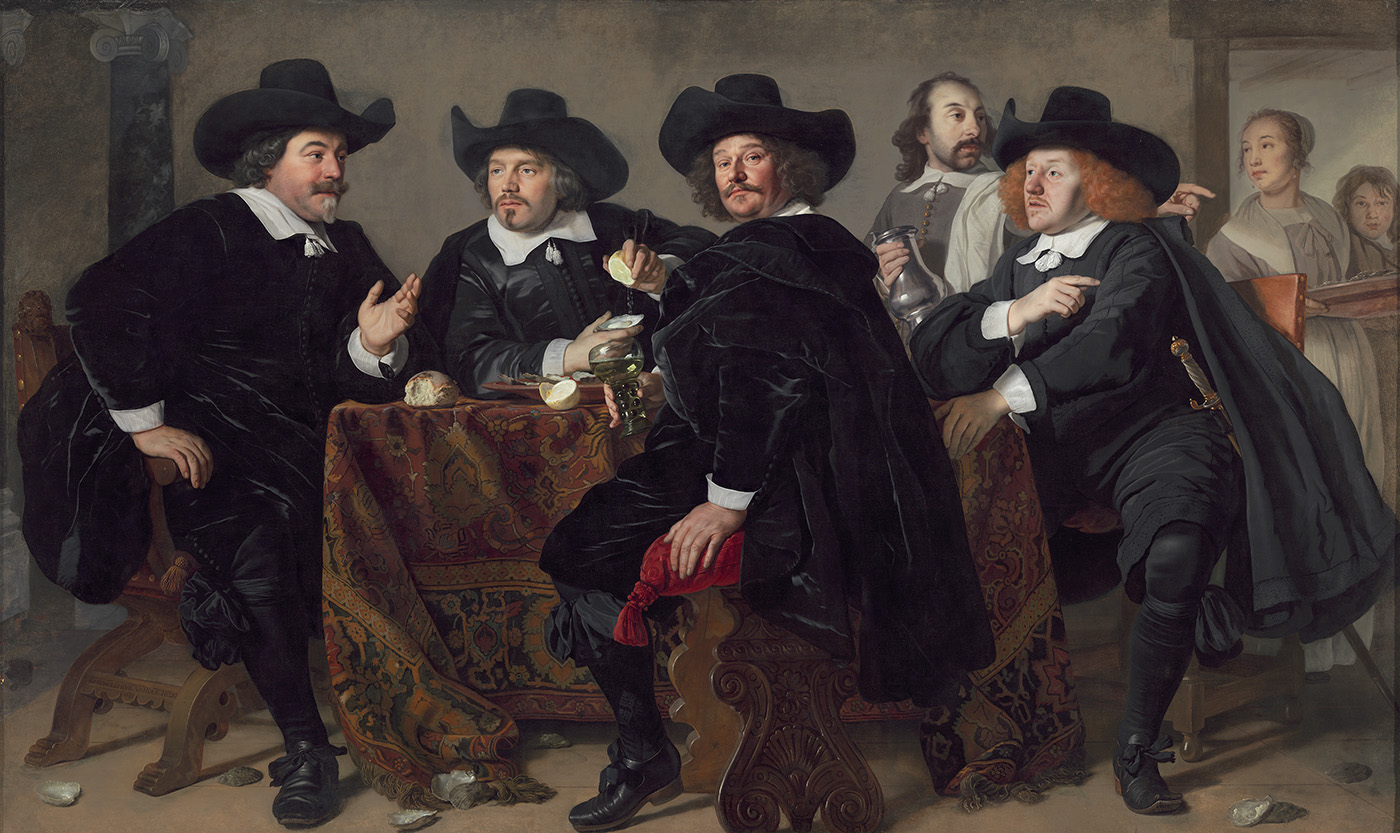
Gerard Reynst, Cornelis Jan Witsen, Roelof Bicker, and Simon van Hoorn.

== Sources ==
- (in Dutch) Nederland's Adelsboek 91 (2004-2005), pp. 286–294.
- (in Dutch) Joh. E. Elias, De vroedschap van Amsterdam, 1903–1905.
