= Witsen =

Witsen is a Dutch surname and may refer to:

- Members of the Witsen family:
  - Cornelis Jan Witsen
  - Nicolaes Witsen
  - Willem Witsen
- 10653 Witsen, asteroid
