= Matteo di Vittore =

Italian painter

Matteo di Vittore was an Italian painter of the Renaissance, active in Venice. He was the pupil and assistant of Giovanni Bellini. He was one of the artists chosen by Bellini to value Giorgione's frescoes in the Fondaco dei Turchi in 1508, and in 1515 worked under his master in the Hall of Council in the Doge's Palace. It seems highly probable that he was identical with Vittore Belliniano.
