= Pieter Both =

Dutch colonial governor

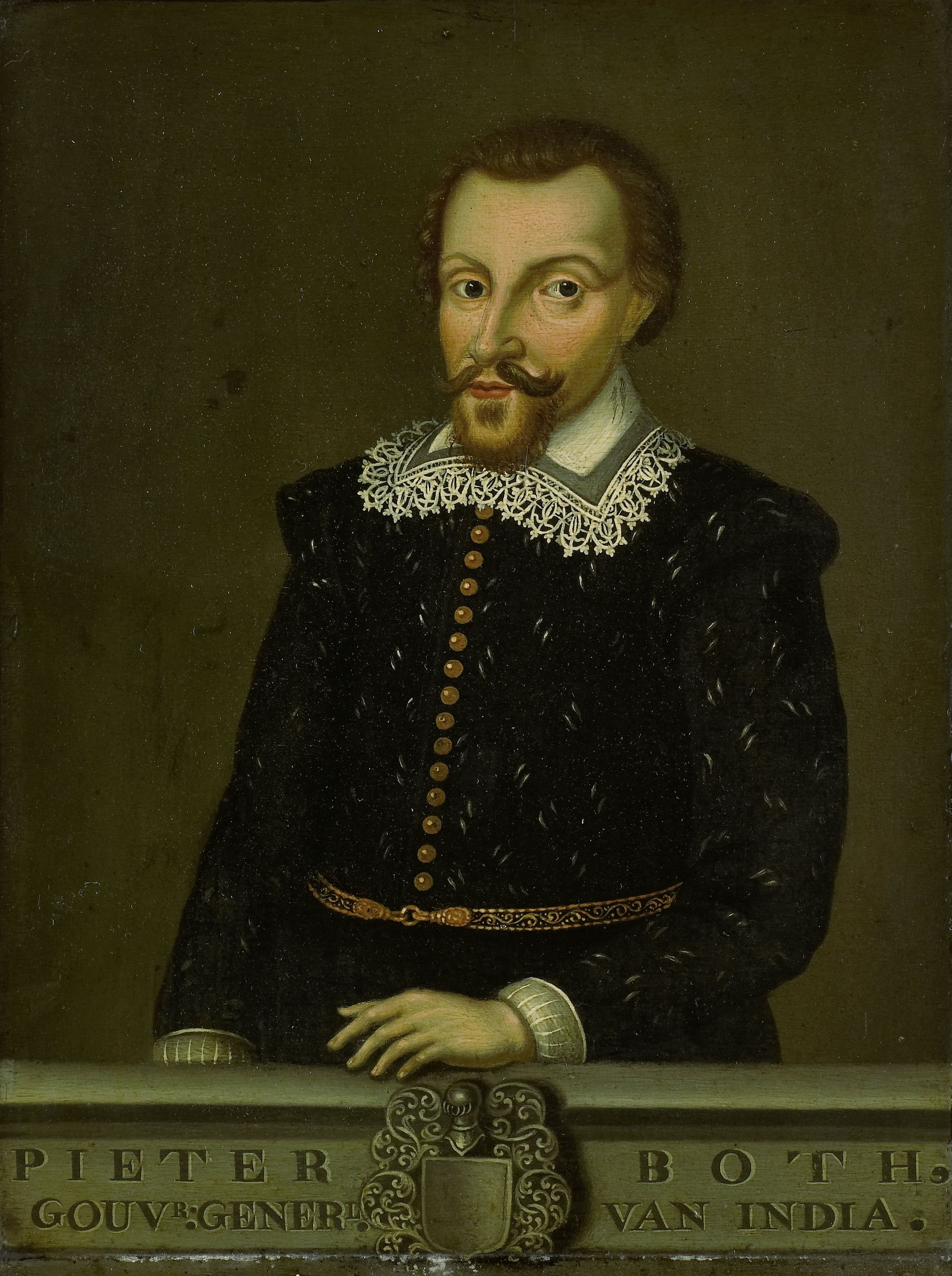
- Portrait of Pieter Both

1st Governor-General of the Dutch East Indies
- In office 19 December 1610 – 6 November 1614
- Preceded by: Position established
- Succeeded by: Gerard Reynst

Personal details
- Born: 1568 Amersfoort, Spanish Netherlands
- Died: 6 March 1615 (aged 46–47) Indian Ocean (near Mauritius)

Pieter Both (1568 – 6 March 1615) was the first Governor-General of the Dutch East Indies.

Not much is known of his early years. In 1599, Both was already an admiral in the New, or Brabant Company. In that year, he traveled to the East Indies with four ships. When the newly founded Dutch East India Company set up a government for the Dutch East Indies, Pieter Both was invited to become the Governor-General. He held that position from 19 December 1610 to 6 November 1614. During that period he concluded contracts with the Moluccans, conquered Timor, and drove the Spaniards out of Tidore.

After he relinquished his position as Governor-General to Gerard Reynst, he left for the Netherlands with four ships. Two of the ships were shipwrecked in Mauritius at Flic-en-Flac, and Pieter Both drowned.

The second highest mountain of Mauritius is named after him. As well as a mountain peak and associated village in the Cirque de Cilaos on Réunion Island.
