= Vendramin family =

Italian merchant family

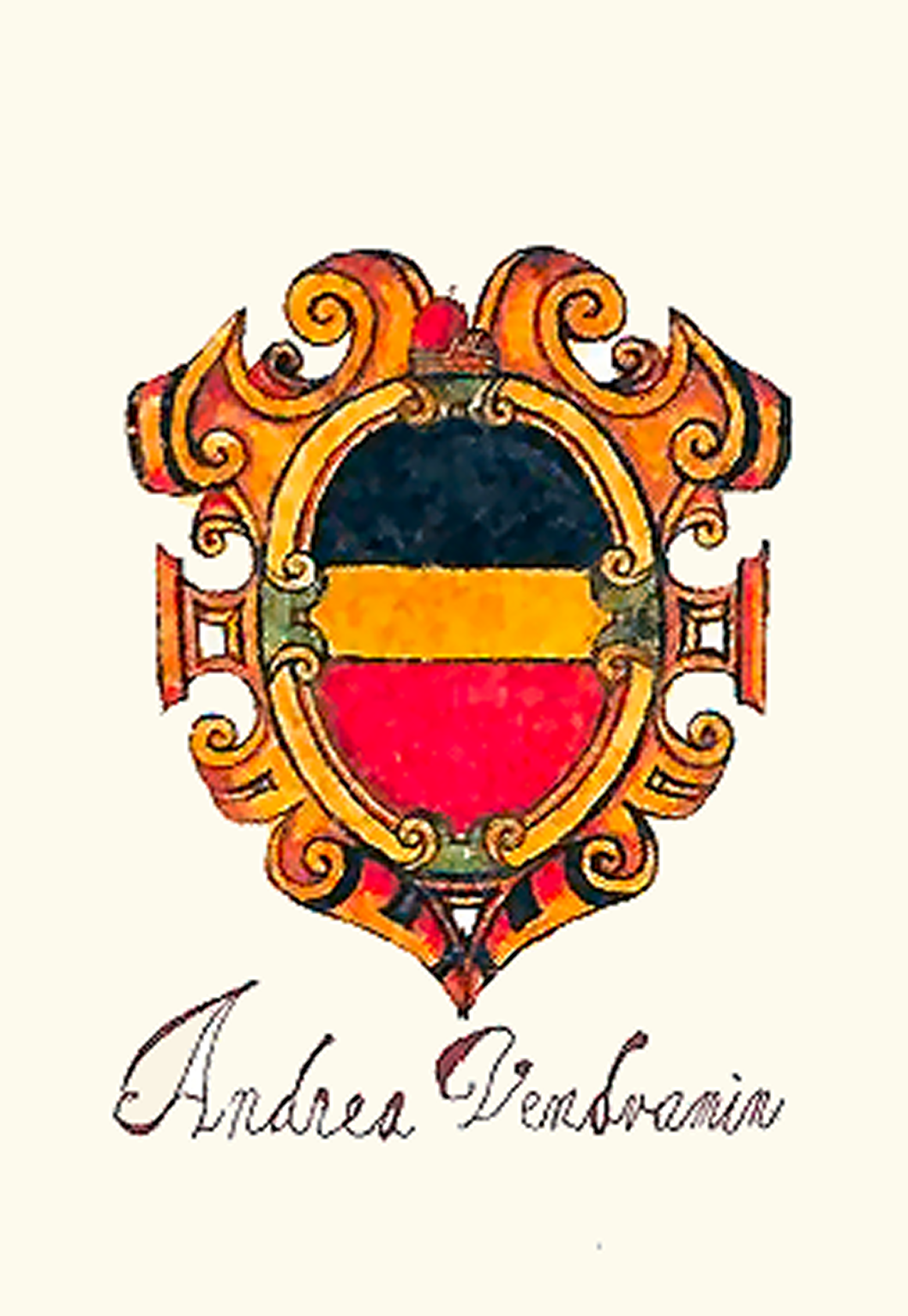
Andrea Vendramin's coat of arms

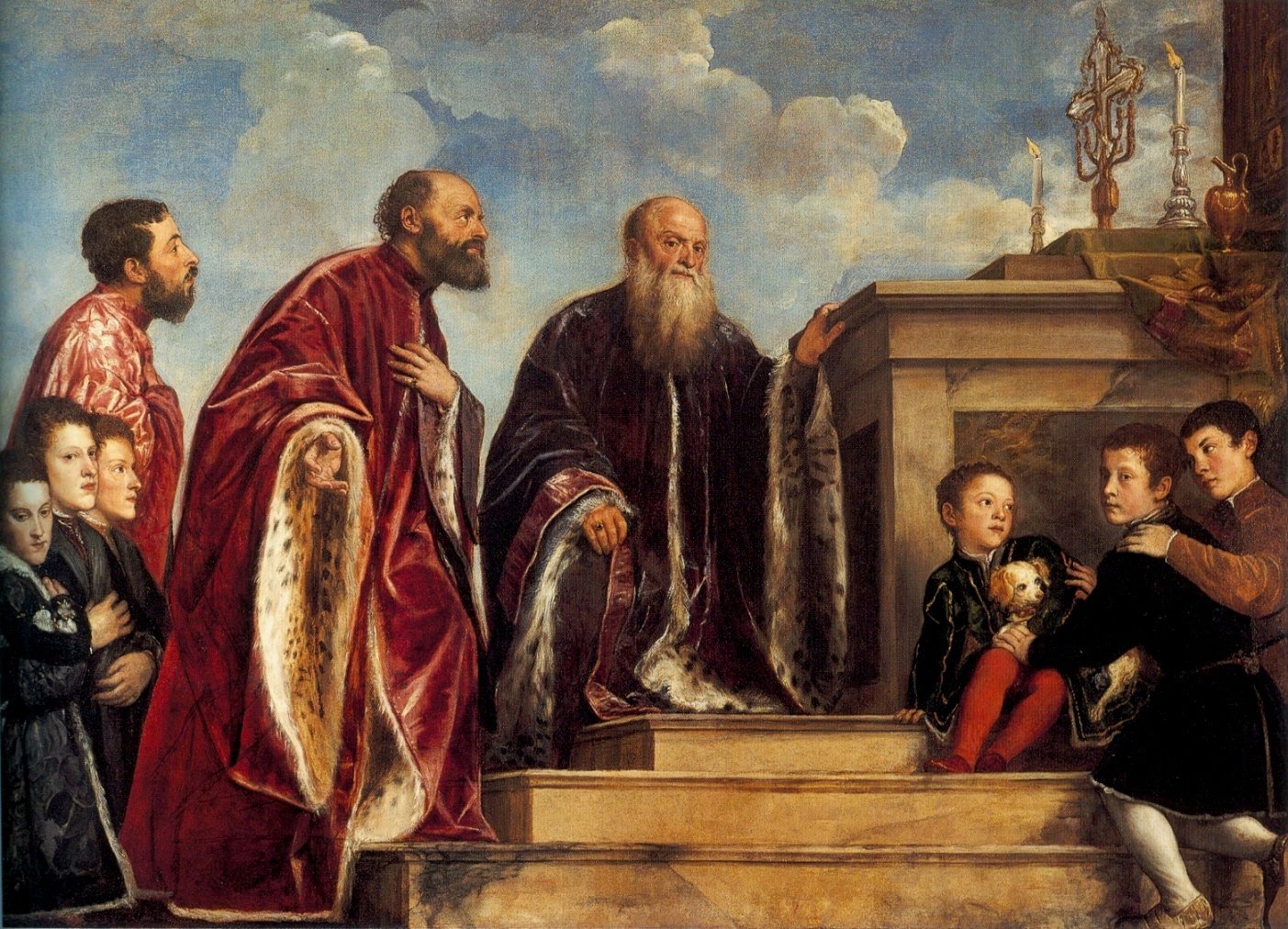
Members of the Vendramin Family Venerating a Relic of the True Cross, Titian and workshop, mid-1540s (National Gallery, London)

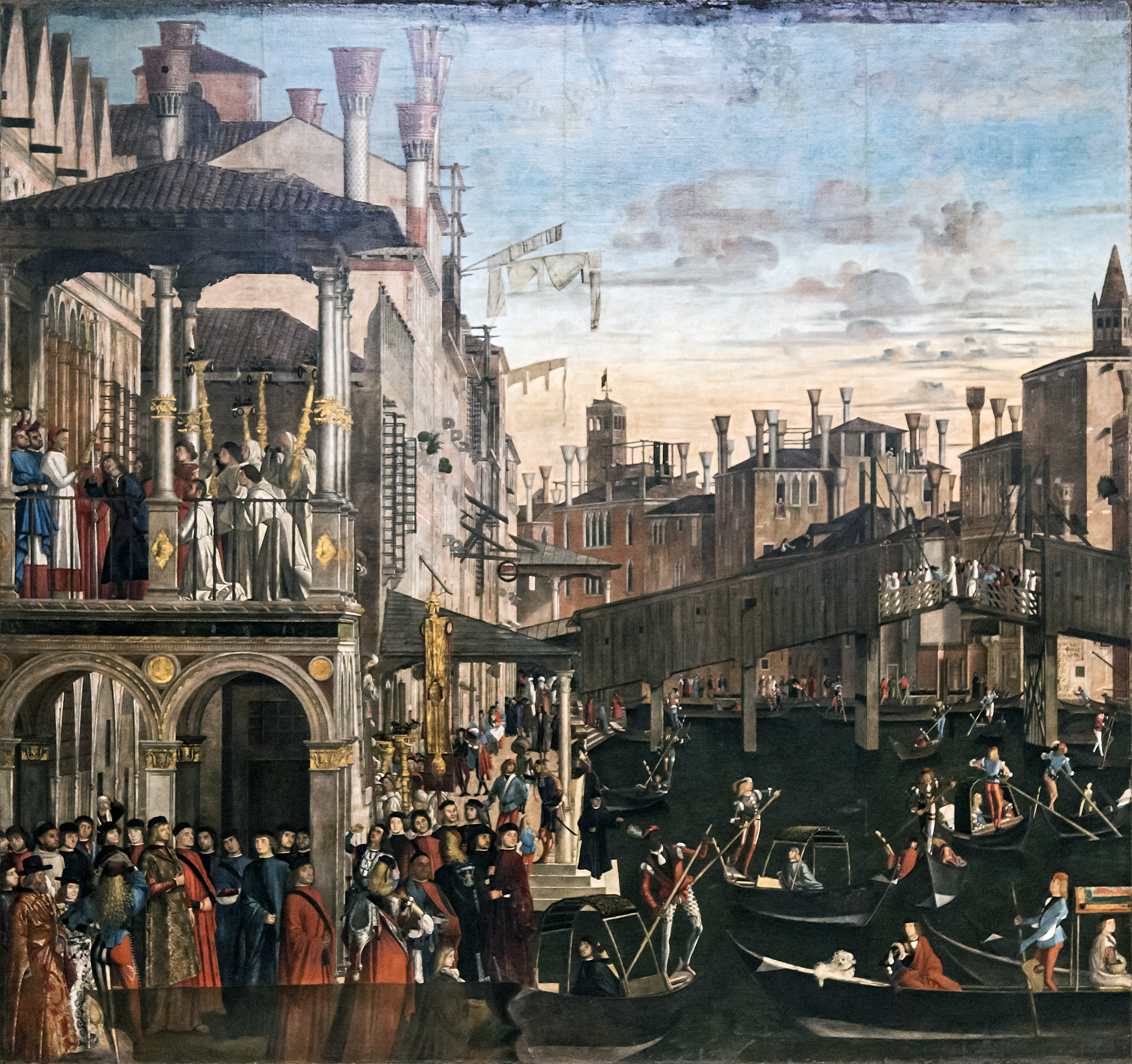
Vittorio Carpaccio, Miracle of the True Cross, 1494

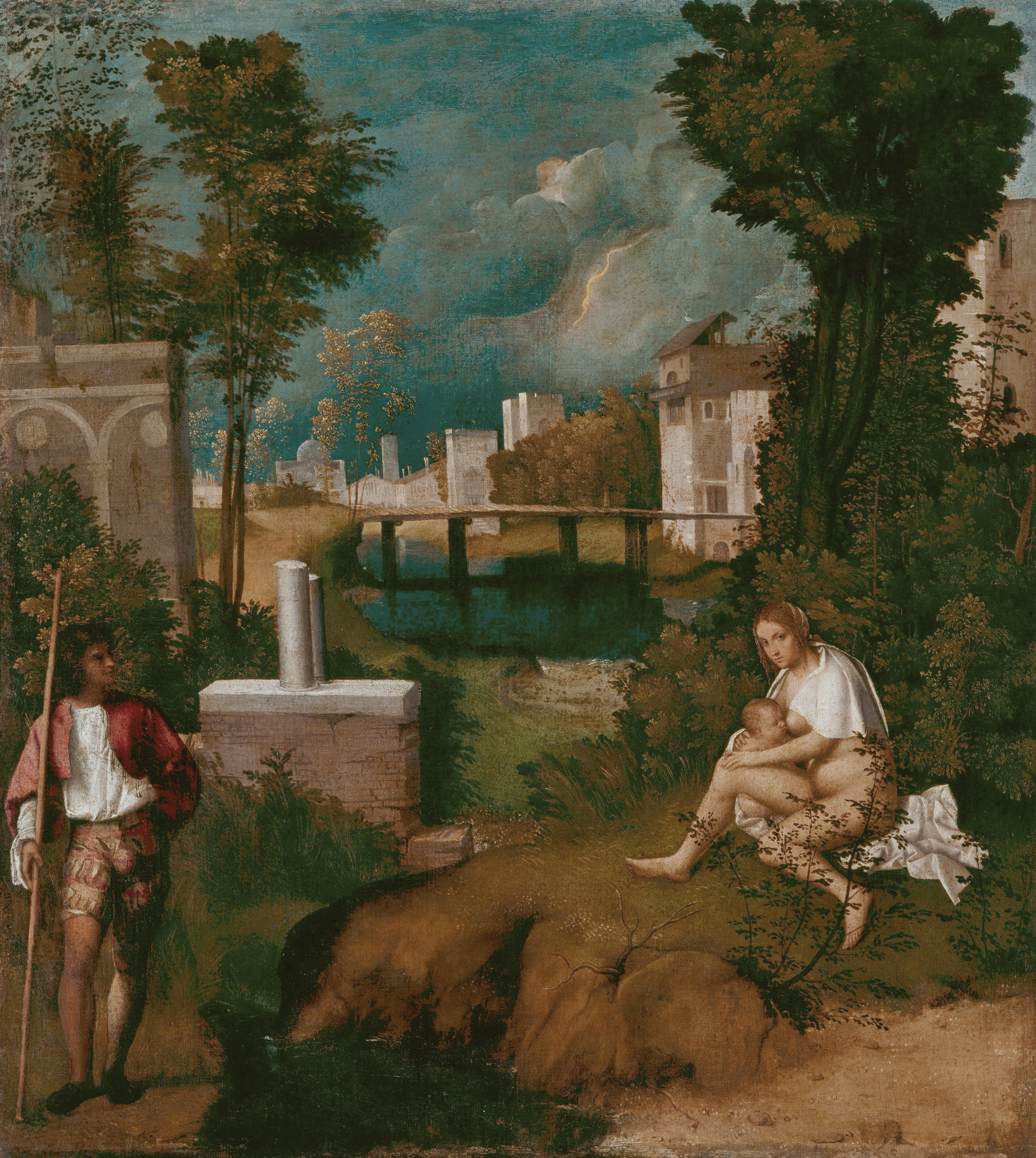
The Tempest by Giorgione, commissioned by Gabriele Vendramin, 1506–08

The House of Vendramin (Italian: [vendraˈmin], Venetian: [veŋdɾaˈmiŋ]) was a rich merchant family of Venice, Italy, who were among the case nuove or "new houses" who joined the patrician class when the Libro d'Oro was opened after the battle of Chioggia (June 1380). Andrea Vendramin served as the sole Vendramin Doge from 1476–78, at the height of Venetian power, though in 1477 an Antonio Feleto was imprisoned, then banished, for remarking in public that the Council of the Forty-One must have been hard-pressed to elect a cheesemonger Doge. In his youth, Andrea and his brother Luca, in joint ventures, used to ship from Alexandria enough goods to fill a galley or a galley and a half, Malipiero recorded in retrospect: even his factors grew rich managing his affairs. At this period, mentions of Vendramins in various fields of business occur; Luca Vendramin (d.1527) founded a successful bank on the still-wooden Rialto Bridge with three Capelli brothers in 1507, but in his will of 1524 forbade his sons from continuing in banking. An early text on accounting mentions that the Vendramins' soap is so reliably good that you can buy it without inspecting it. Later they owned an important theatre.

In the early seventeenth century the Vendramin also provided the Republic of Venice with an ambassador to France (nominated in 1598) and Patriarch of Venice, in Francesco Vendramin (1555-October 7, 1619), elected Patriarch in 1605, despite being a layman, and made a Cardinal in 1615. He introduced a requirement that priests hearing confessions had to be over 35 years old, and take an examination in canon law, despite having himself evaded a Papal examination on the same subject for candidates to the Patriarchy. He bequeathed 600 ducats a year to the Jesuits, then banned from Venice, partly inspiring a law banning legacies to them.

Two main branches of the family descended from Doge Andrea, ancestor of the Patriarch, and his brother Luca, grandfather of the two brothers in the Titian Portrait of the Vendramin Family in the National Gallery, London. The Vendramin became extinct in the main male line when Niccolò Vendramin died in 1840. Today they are remembered almost entirely for their impressive artistic legacy.

== Miracle of the True Cross ==
The reliquary of the True Cross shown on the altar in the National Gallery Titian, which still exists, was connected with a miracle in 1370-82 depicted by Vittorio Carpaccio, Gentile Bellini and other artists. When accidentally dropped into a canal during a congested procession it did not sink but hovered over the water, evading others trying to help, until an earlier Andrea Vendramin (grandfather of the Doge) dived in and retrieved it. This Andrea had been presented with the relic in 1369, in his capacity as head of the confraternity Scuola Grande di San Giovanni Evangelista of San Giovanni Evangelista; the scuola still own it. Both the large Bellini painting, The Miracle of the True Cross near San Lorenzo Bridge, of 1496–1500,, and the Carpaccio of 1494, are now in the Accademia museum.

== Monuments ==
Doge Andrea has what is generally agreed to be "the most lavish funerary monument of Renaissance Venice", in the basilica of Santi Giovanni e Paolo, the usual burial-place of Doges, by Tullio Lombardo. However the portrait in the Frick Collection by Gentile Bellini, inscribed with his name, is now considered to be of his successor, Doge Giovanni Mocenigo.

The Cardinal-Patriarch is commemorated in the Vendramin chapel of San Pietro di Castello, designed by Baldassare Longhena, with two marble high reliefs by Michele Ongharo, of Vendramin's consecration as cardinal by Pope Paul V and an allegory of Death.

== Collectors ==
In the first half of the sixteenth century Gabriele Vendramin was a notable patron of artists and the owner of one of the most significant collections in Venice. Sebastiano Serlio saluted him in print as an authority on ancient Roman buildings and the work of Vitruvius. He was painted with his brother Andrea and Andrea's seven sons in Titian's Portrait of the Vendramin Family in the 1540s (illustration). Though he married Maria Grimani in 1538, and had seven daughters, none of the women of the Vendramin house appeared in the group portrait.

The Vendramin collection was one of the marvels of Venice noted in print by Jacopo Sansovino in his Descrizione di Venezia, 1581. Tantalising glimpses of Gabriele's collection as it was displayed in 1530 in the Camerino, or "little study", of Palazzo Vendramin in Santa Fosca feature in the writings of Marcantonio Michiel, who left important descriptions of many of the patrician collections of Venice. He commissioned The Tempest from Giorgione, and also had his portrait and The Education of Marcus Aurelius by the same artist, both now lost. Among several bound albums of drawings, he owned the large album by Jacopo Bellini now in the British Museum; there was also an important collection of prints. Contemporary observers were more impressed with Gabriele's classical statues and his collection of ancient coins than his paintings.

After Gabriele Vendramin's death in 1552, the collection passed to the three sons of his brother, Andrea, with the stipulation that it remain intact. The high-living heirs came to a lawsuit over the collection, when agents of Albrecht V of Bavaria, led by Jacopo Strada, were negotiating over acquiring it in toto. the brothers mutually blocked the sale. With the death of the eldest, Luca, in December 1601, occasioning a second inventory, the collection began to be dispersed by the Vendramin heirs in the next generation.

The important paintings in the collection when it was in the hands of a younger Andrea Vendramin (c. 1565-1629) in 1627 were documented in an album of pen-and-ink drawings before they were purchased in Venice after his death by the Dutch merchant and connoisseur Jan Reynst and passed to the Reynst Collection in Amsterdam in the seventeenth century; at least one of his Italian paintings was among those presented to Charles II of England in 1660, as part of the diplomatic gesture called the "Dutch Gift". Other works included the so-called Self-Portrait as David with the head of Goliath ascribed to Giorgione, now in Vienna, another lost painting attributed to Giorgione, the Allegory of Wealth, sold in the Netherlands to the Elector of Brandenburg (by Hendrick van Uylenburgh), and a Giovanni Bellini now in Washington.

The paintings filled only one of the volumes of Latin text. Andrea Vendramin's cabinet of curiosities at San Gregorio was described in three further illustrated volumes, also at the British Library; signet rings, seals and scarabs and carved gems filled a second, while curiosities of natural history and gems and minerals filled two more.

== Palazzi ==
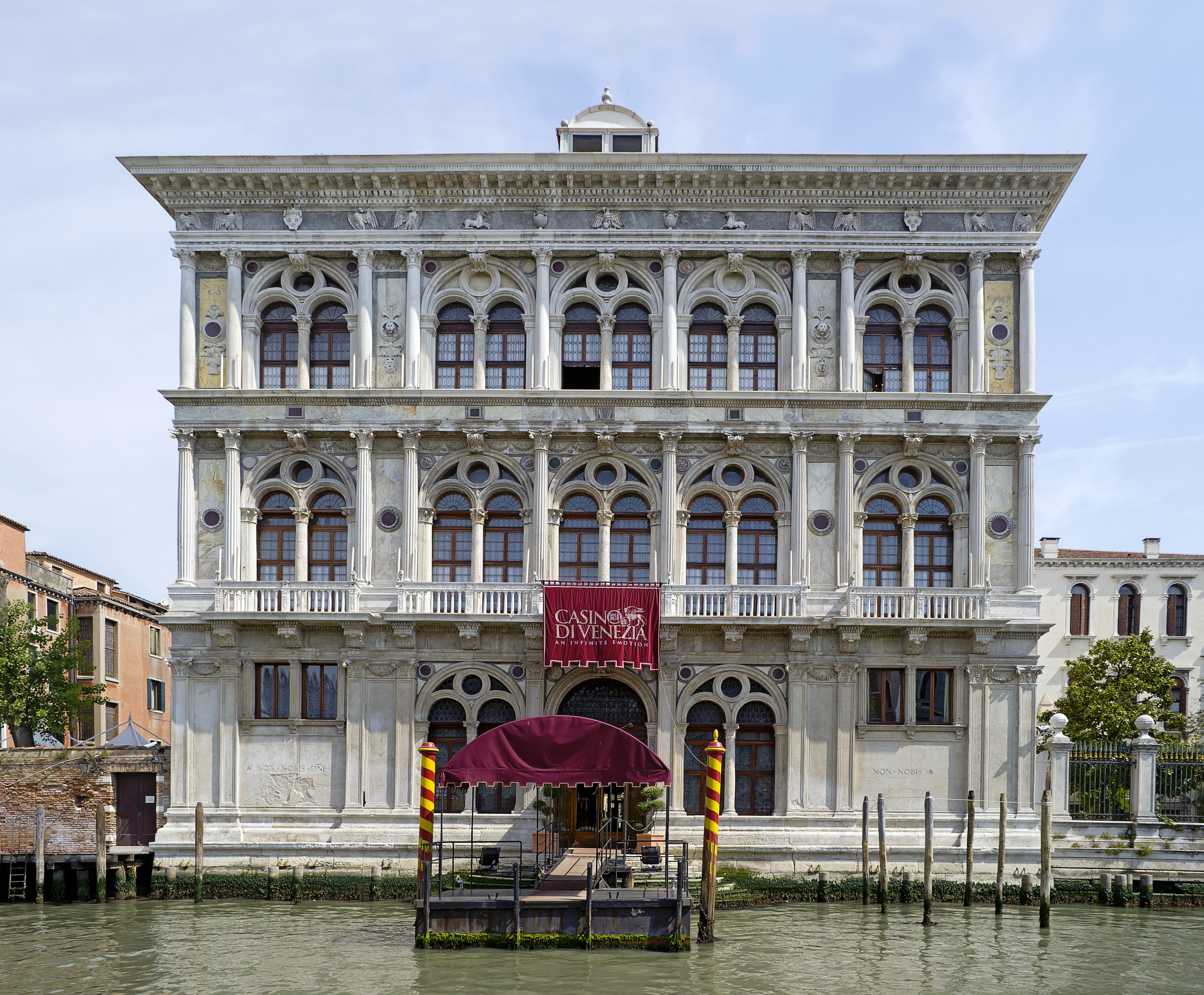
Ca' Vendramin Calergi

What is now the most prominent "Palazzo Vendramin" in Venice, the splendid Ca' Vendramin Calergi by Mauro Codussi, built in 1481 on the Grand Canal, was in fact only inherited by the family in 1739, and is now the casino as well as being famous as the place where Richard Wagner died in 1883, during the times that the palace belonged to Henri, Count of Chambord and Duke of Bordeaux. Some rooms are kept as a museum commemorating Wagner's stay. Another Palazzo Vendramin, on the island of Giudecca just opposite the Doge's Palace, is now an annexe of the Hotel Cipriani; this is a later building replacing a Vendramin palace that can be seen in the bird's-eye View of Venice by Jacopo de' Barberi of 1500. The 16th century Ca' Vendramin di Santa Fosca in the Cannaregio quarter, now also a hotel, is where Gabriele Vendramin's collection was housed. Yet another is "Palazzo Vendramin dei Carmini", in Dorsoduro, most of which is now occupied by part of the University of Venice.

== Theatre entrepreneurs ==
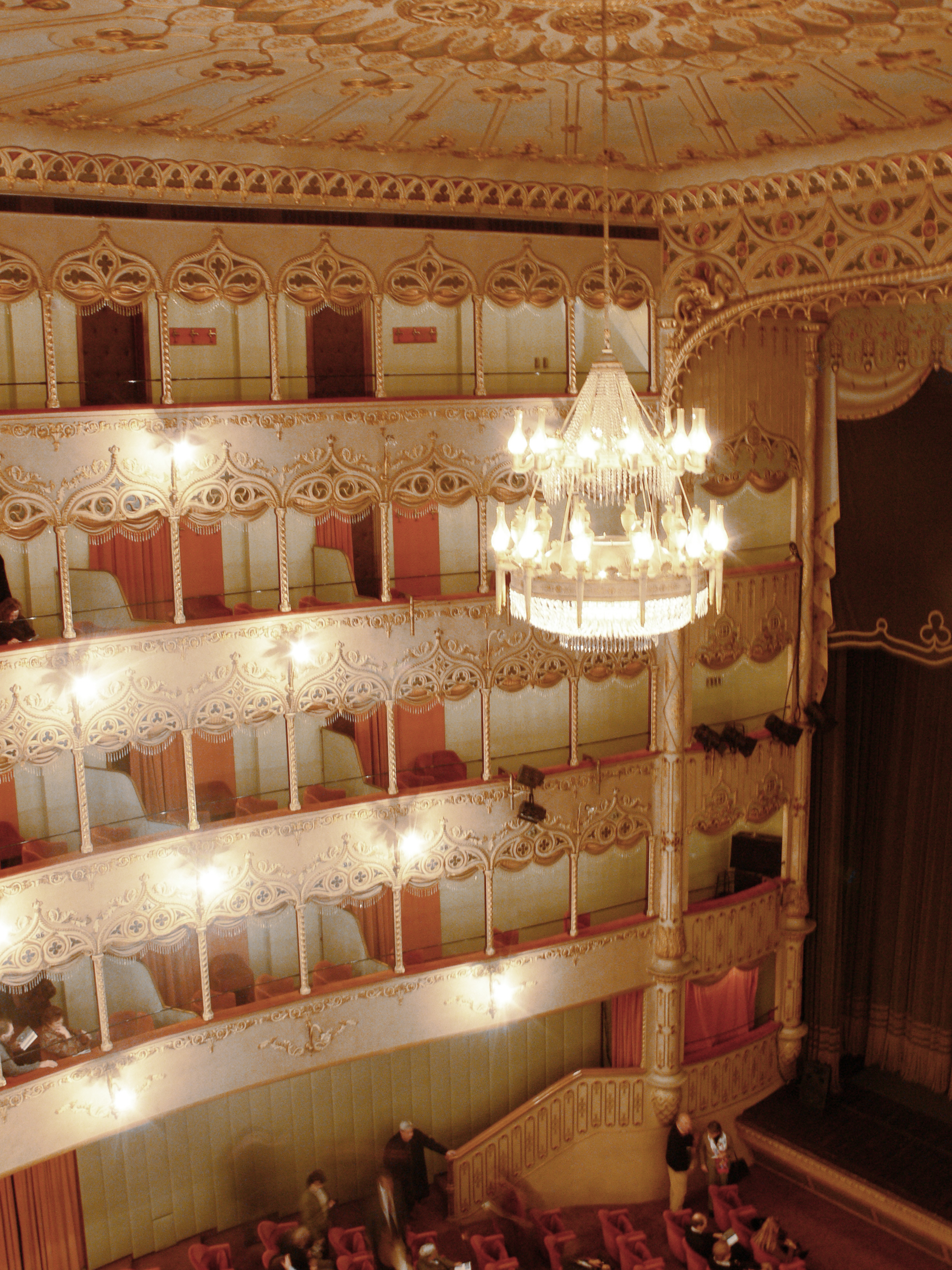
Interior of the Teatro Vendramin, now Teatro Goldoni; the present building dates from the 1720s.

All the main Venetian theatres were owned by important patrician families; combining business with pleasure in the Italian city— perhaps even the European city— with the most crowded and competitive theatrical culture. When most opera in Europe was still being put on by courts, "economic prospects and a desire for exhibitionistic display", as well a decline in their traditional overseas trading, attracted the best Venetian families to invest in the theatre during the 17th century. Europe's first dedicated public and commercial opera house was the Teatro Tron from 1637.

The Grimani, with whom the Vendramin often inter-married, were dominant, owning what is now called the Teatro Malibran, then called the Teatro San Giovanni Grisostomo, as well as the Teatro San Benedetto and other houses. The Venier family owned La Fenice, still the main opera house. The Vendramin owned the important Teatro di San Luca or Teatro Vendramin or Teatro San Salvatore, founded in 1622, later renamed the Teatro Apollo, and since 1875 called the Teatro Goldoni, which still thrives as the city's main theatre for plays, now in a building of the 1720s.

In the age of Carlo Goldoni, the greatest Venetian dramatist, only the San Luca and the Malibran still put on spoken drama, and his desertion of the Grimani for the Vendramins at San Luca in 1752 was a major event in the theatrical history of the period, ushering in perhaps his finest period, in which as well as his comedies, he played a significant role in the development of the opera buffa.

The Vendramins, who had considerable direct involvement in the management of the theatre, had a sometimes uneasy relationship with him, arguing over money and the style of his plays, until he left for Paris in 1761, as a result of a dispute with his rival, Carlo Gozzi. However the Vendramin did not take their involvement as far as Vincenzo Grimani, who was a cardinal and opera librettist. The theatre remained important, and in 1826 was the first in Italy to be fitted with gas lighting; it remained in the hands of the descendants of the Vendramin until 1957. The archives of the Teatro Vendramin, now held in the museum that was Goldoni's house, are increasingly being used by historians.
