= Gerard Reynst =

Dutch merchant (1560s–1615)

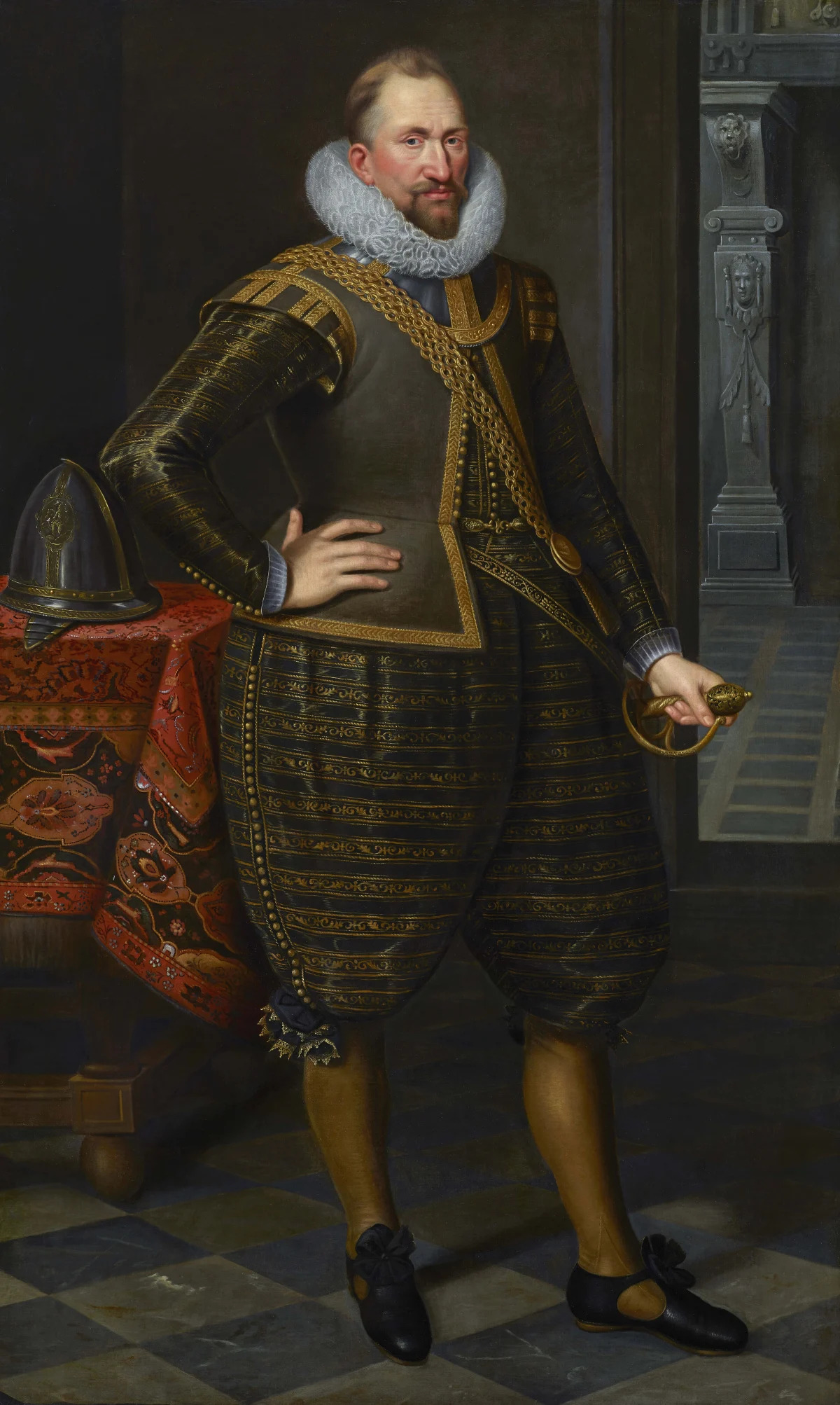
- 1613 Frans Badens – Portrait of Gerard Reynst

2nd Governor-General of the Dutch East Indies
- In office 6 November 1614 – 7 December 1615
- Preceded by: Pieter Both
- Succeeded by: Laurens Reael

Personal details
- Born: 1560s Amsterdam
- Died: 7 December 1615 Jayakarta, Banten Sultanate

Gerard Reynst (1560s – 7 December 1615) was a Dutch merchant and later the second Governor-General of the Dutch East Indies.

== Biography ==
All that is known of his early years is that he was born in Amsterdam, the son of Pieter Rijnst (ca.1510–1574), soap boiler from the later patrician Reynst family, and Trijn Sijverts. In 1588 he married Margrieta Nicquet and bought a house in Amsterdam from his older brother Reijnst. In 1599, as a merchant and ship-owner, he became a founder-member and administrator of the Nieuwe or Brabantsche Compagnie which, in 1600, became the Vereenighde Company of Amsterdam. This company then in 1602 merged into the Dutch East India Company (VOC).

On the request of his elders in the college of the Heren XVII (17 men), he became Governor-general of the Dutch East Indies in 1613 and left with 9 ships. The trip lasted 18 months, after which he took over command from Pieter Both. On the way, he had already sent one of his ships to the Red Sea to start trade relations with the Arabs there. His May 1605 expedition against the Banda island of Ai was a failure. He died more than a year after arrival, having caught dysentery so that he could do little there, besides a few minor activities that were only intermittently successful.

There is a street named after him in The Hague, Gerard Reijnststraat, which is situated very close to the area which the Allies mistakenly bombed during World War II.

== Family ==
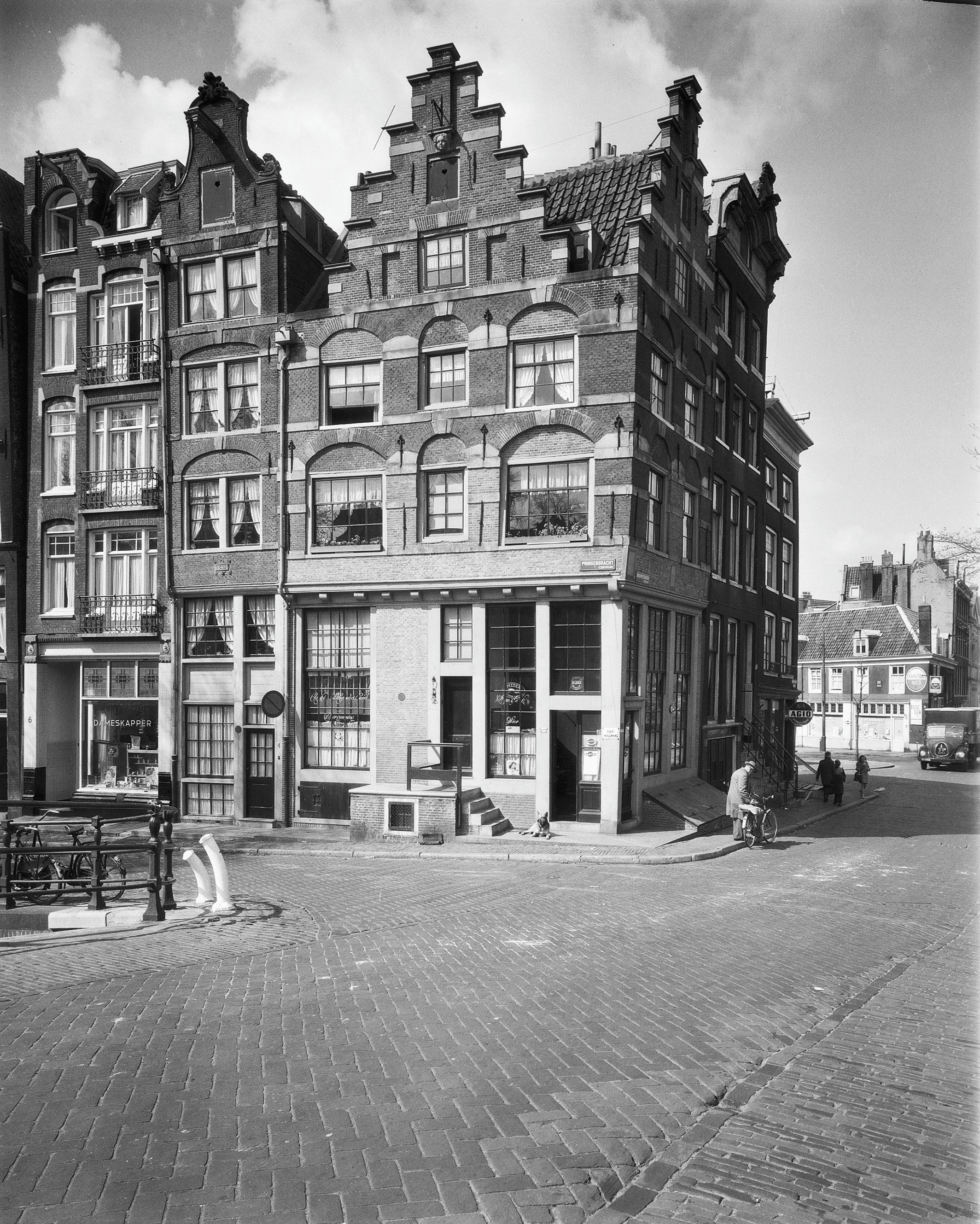
In 1615 Gerrit Reynst became the owner of an empty lot, now Prinsengracht 2; his heirs Samuel Blommaert and his wife Catharina Reynst sold the lot in 1617.

In 1588 in Haarlem Reijnst married Margriet Niquet, daughter of the wealthy merchant and art-collector Jean Niquet (1539–1608) from Antwerp. At his death, Reijnst left his wife, who had accompanied him to the East Indies, with seven children. The younger of these she raised with her brother Jacques Nicquet, who was an art-collector as well. Among their children were the art-collecting brothers Gerard and Jan (1601–1646). His daughter Weijntje became the mother of the merchant Isaak Isaaksz Coymans (1622–1673), one of the founders of the Danish West India Company.
