= Jan Reynst =

Dutch merchant (1601–1646)

Jan Reynst (26 October 1601 – 29 June 1646) was a Protestant Dutch merchant in Amsterdam and, with his elder brother Gerrit, an art collector and owner of the Reynst collection.

== Life ==
Reynst was born in Amsterdam, the son of the merchant Gerard Reynst of the Reynst family, who in the year 1614 became the second Governor-General of the Dutch East Indies, and Margrieta Nicquet, whose merchant brother Jacques Nicquet was a fervent art collector. In 1625 Jan went to Venice where he collected antique statuary and Italian paintings and where he was able to purchase the collection - the so called Reynst collection - of 230 sculptures and 140 paintings of the estate Andrea Vendramin in 1629. After his death the Roman statues and Italian paintings by Barocci, Bassano, Bellini, Paris Bordone, Pordenone, Palma Vecchio Giorgione, Lorenzo Lotto, Parmigianino, Guido Reni, Giulio Romano, Tintoretto, Titian, Andrea Schiavone, Perugino, Antonello da Messina and Paolo Veronese were shipped to his brother in Amsterdam.

In 1671 Jan Reynst (his son?) bought a house that housed a secret Catholic church (now the Museum Amstelkring), planning to rent it out as storage space but instead realising he could make more money from charging Catholic worshippers to continue using their secret church. He died in Venice.

== See also ==
- Dutch Gift
- Reynst Collection
