= Gerrit Reynst =

Dutch art collector (1599–1658)

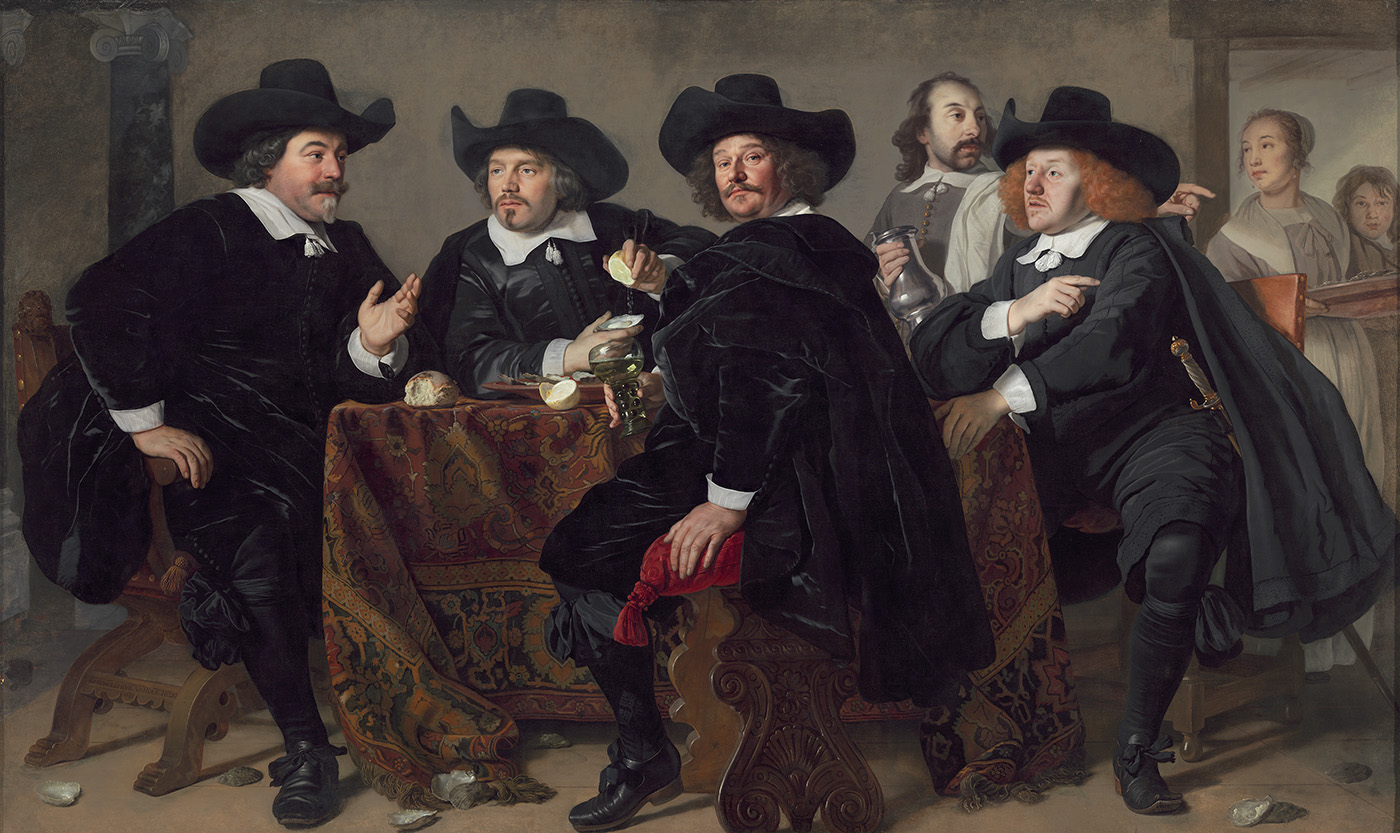
Reynst (far right), with (from left) his fellow aldermen and contemporaries Cornelis Jan Witsen, Roelof Bicker, and Simon van Hoorn.

Gerrit Reynst (1599 – 29 June 1658) (also known as Gerard Reynst) was, like his younger brother Jan (1601–1646), a Dutch merchant and art collector from Amsterdam, with his brother owner of the Reynst Collection. He was an alderman and member of the town council, entering it in 1646.

== Biography ==
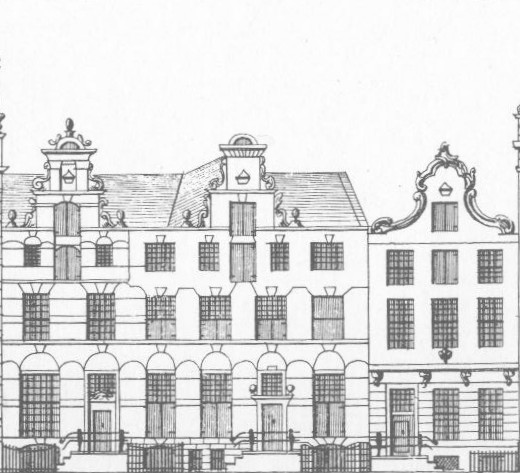
The house, where Reynst lived, known as Hope, was a copy of the house in the middle. The two houses shown here on Keizersgracht were called Belief and Love. Engraving around 1770 by Caspar Philips

Reynst was born in Amsterdam, the son of the merchant Gerard Reynst from the Reynst family, who in the year 1614 became the second Governor-General of the Dutch East Indies, and Margrieta Nicquet, whose merchant brother Jacques Nicquet was a fervent art collector. Gerard Jr. lived in a house called De Hoop at Keizersgracht 209 that he later made into an art museum. His brother Jan was a collector of antique statuary and Italian paintings who was able to purchase the collection of the estate Andrea Vendramin in 1629, 230 sculptures and 140 paintings. After Jan's death in 1646 almost all of these were sent to Gerard, who published a selection of 112 items in the collection with the help of Gerard de Lairesse as Signorum Veterum Icones, and opened his house to visitors. Amalia van Solms and Cosimo de' Medici were some of the more notable visitors. Reynst never lived to see his book published, since he drowned in the canal in front of his Amsterdam house in 1658.

== Reynst Collection ==
Gerrit's collection included Italian old-master paintings and antiquities, such as The Ecstasy of St Paul by Johann Liss. After Gerrit's death in 1658 the collection dispersed into English, German and other Dutch collections, including what is now the Antikensammlung Berlin, and some remained with his widow Anna. The Dutch Republic bought 24 of the best Italian paintings and 12 of the best Classical sculptures from Gerrit's widow in 1660 for 80,000 gulden, via Heer van Outshoorn. This collection was given to English King Charles II (many of the paintings in it had previously been in Charles I's collection, and been sold to Reynst by the Commonwealth government) on his return from the Netherlands to England, and is known as the Dutch Gift. (Note: See also Halbertsma on the sculpture, and Logan on the collection as a whole.) One of the paintings may have been Guercino's, "Semiramis Receiving Word of the Revolt of Babylon". (A series of engravings of pictures from his collection was made sometime before his death, including one by Jeremias Falk of Guercino's Semiramis.)

== See also ==
- Dutch Gift
- Reynst Collection
