= Dutch Gift =

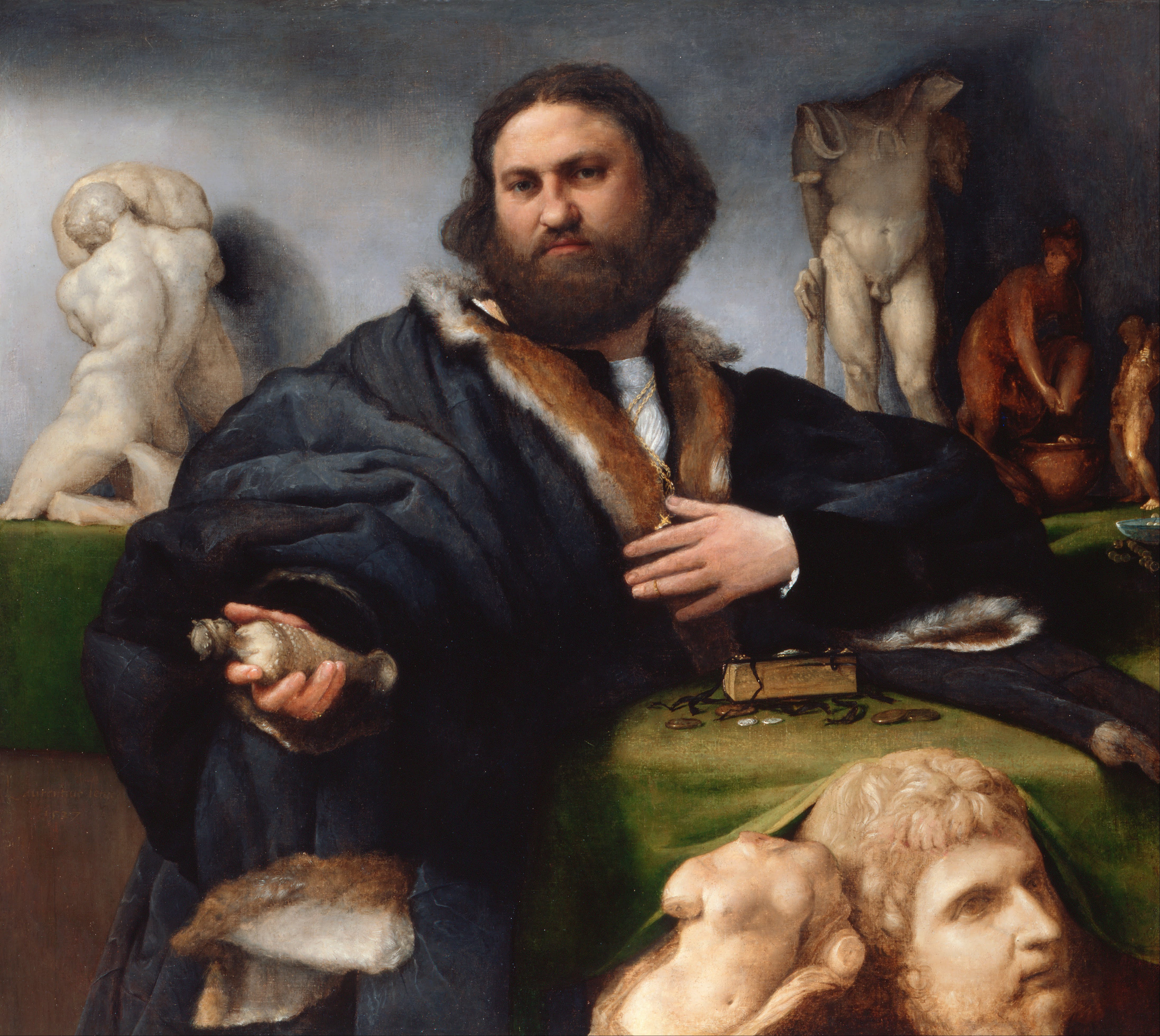
Lorenzo Lotto's portrait of Andrea Odoni, 1527

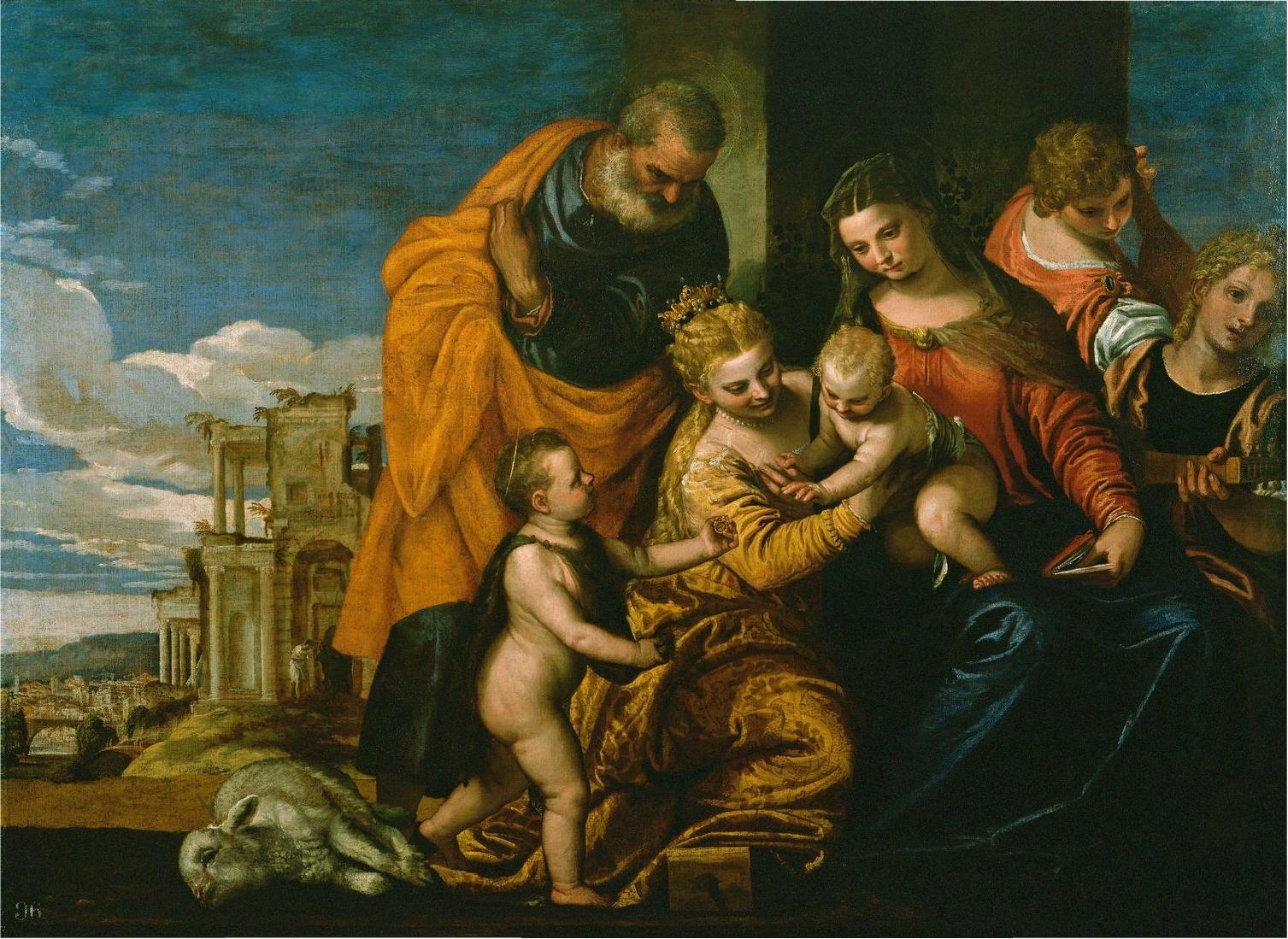
Paolo Veronese and workshop, The Mystic Marriage of St Catherine of Alexandria, c. 1562–9

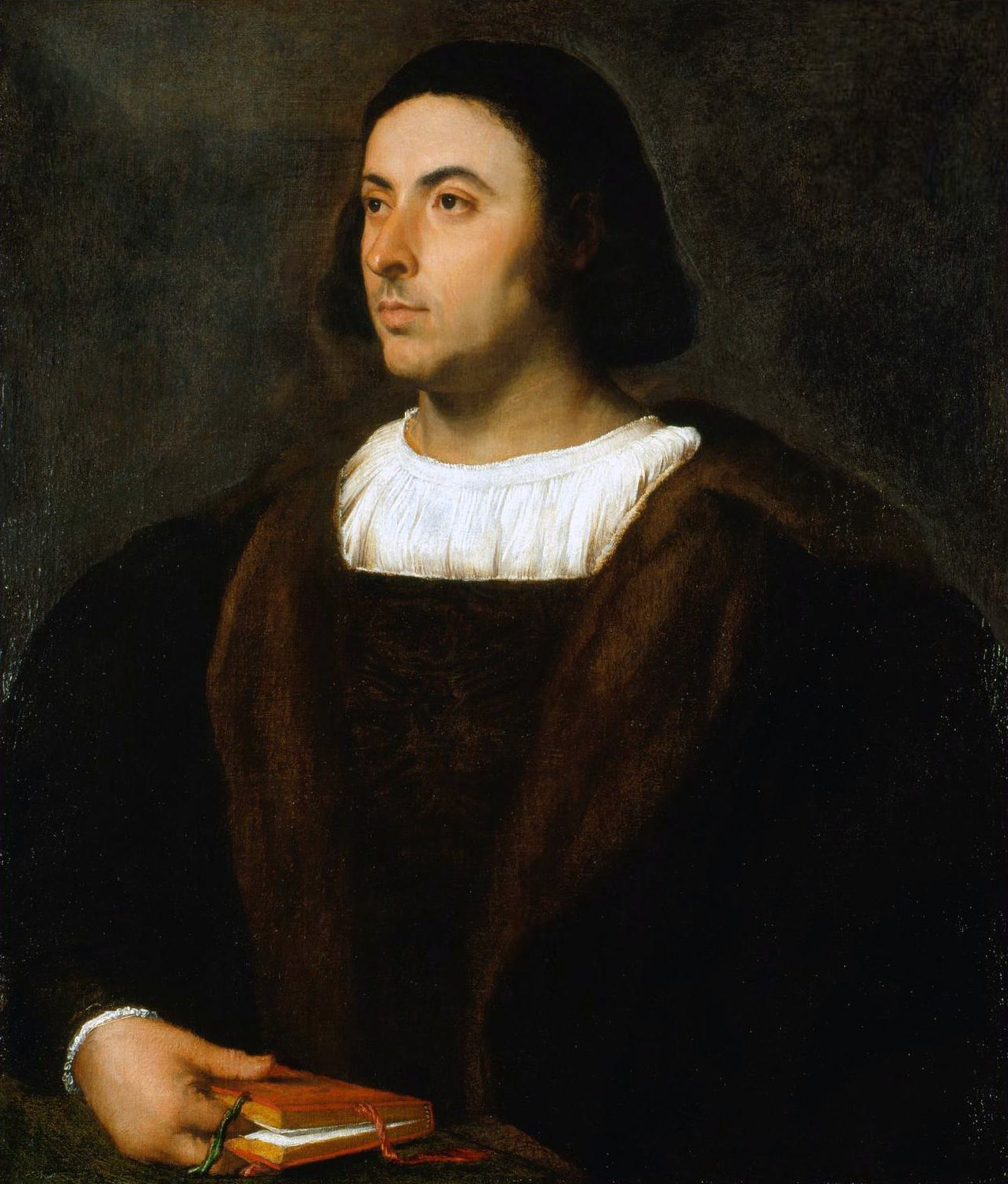
Titian, Portrait of Jacopo Sannazaro, c. 1514–18

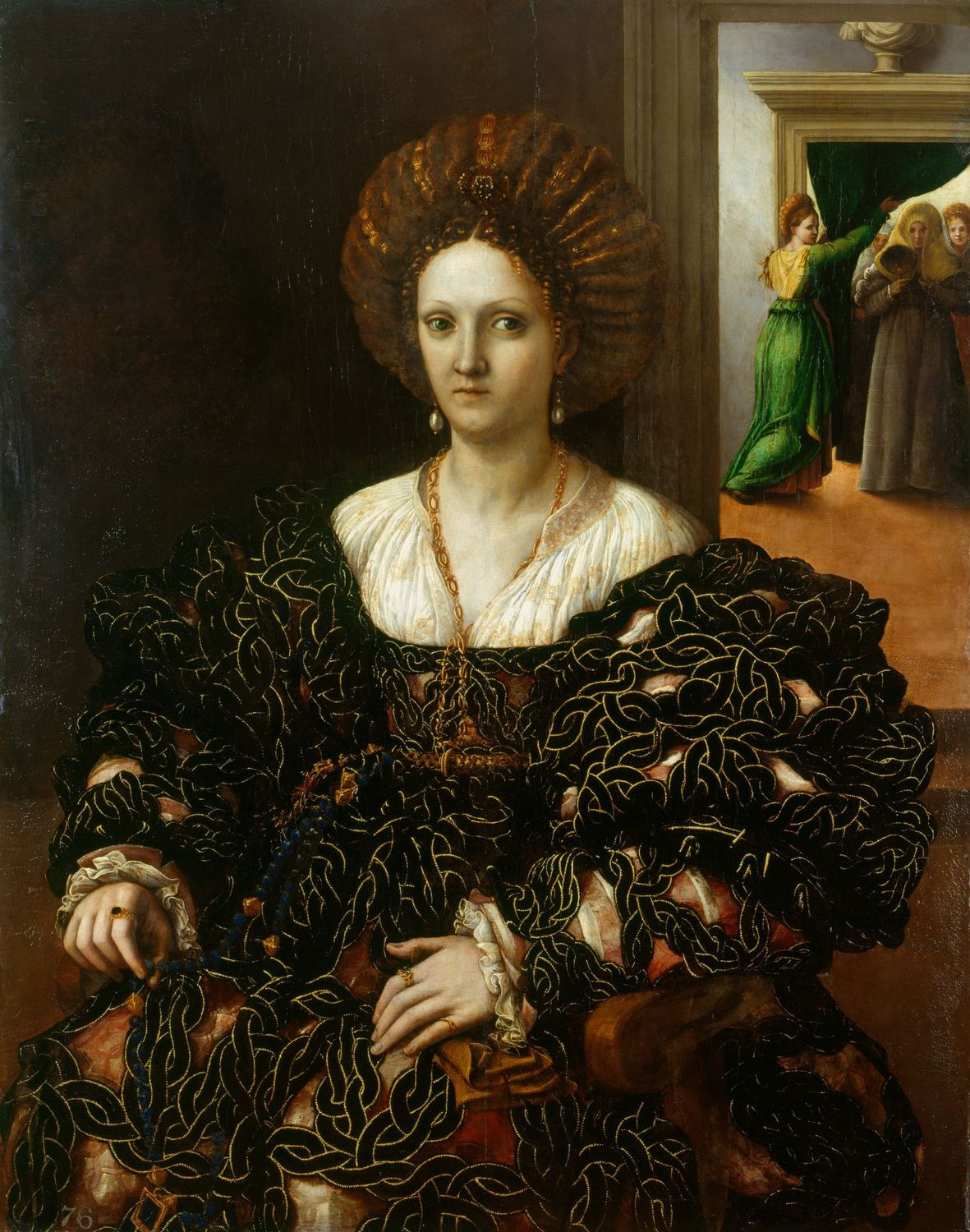
Giulio Romano, Portrait of Margherita Palaeologa, c.1531

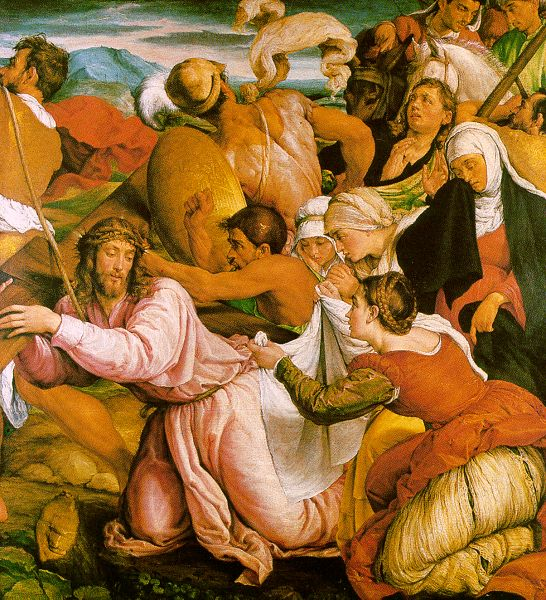
Jacopo Bassano's Christ carrying the cross is now in the National Gallery, London.

The Dutch Gift of 1660 was a collection of 24 mostly Italian Renaissance paintings, four by Dutch Masters, and twelve classical sculptures. The gift was presented to newly restored King Charles II of England on 16 November by envoys of the States of Holland.

Most of the paintings and all the Roman sculptures were from the Reynst collection, the most important seventeenth-century Dutch collection of paintings of the Italian sixteenth century, formed in Venice by Jan Reynst (1601–1646) and extended by his brother, Gerrit Reynst (1599–1658). The gift reflected the taste Charles shared with his father, Charles I, whose large collection, one of the most magnificent in Europe, had mostly been sold abroad after he was executed in 1649. Charles II was not as keen a collector as his father, but appreciated art and was later able to recover a good number of the items from the pre-war collection that remained in England, as well as purchasing many further paintings, and many significant old master drawings.

Some decades later, there was a reverse movement when 36 paintings from the English Royal Collection, including at least one of those given in 1660, were taken by the Dutch King William III of England to his Dutch palace of Het Loo. His successor to the throne, Queen Anne, tried to recover these after William's death in 1702 but failed, and they mostly remain in Dutch public collections. Fourteen paintings from the 1660 gift remain in the Royal Collection, with others now in different collections around the world.

== Gift ==
The collection was promised to Charles II at a party in Mauritshuis in May 1660, to mark his return to power in the English Restoration. After the Declaration of Breda he and his two brothers James and Henry travelled to the Hague. Charles had spent many years in exile in Paris, where his mother lived, Cologne, and the Spanish Netherlands, during the short period of the English Commonwealth when England was a republic. It was intended to strengthen family ties and diplomatic relations between England and the Republic. The gift was organized by Cornelis de Graeff and Andries de Graeff.

The gift seems to have included the Klencke Atlas, based on the ideas of Mare Liberum. An end of the Anglo-Spanish War (1654–1660), a renewal of the Navigation Act and the foundation of the Royal African Company would mean more competition in the East, the West and Africa. Only a few years after the gift the two nations would be at war again in the Second Anglo-Dutch War.

The 24 Italian paintings and the 12 sculptures had been part of the Reynst Collection assembled by Gerrit Reynst (also known as Gerard Reynst) and his brother Jan Reynst, who had been based in Venice for many years. Much of the collection originated from the famous Vendramin family collection there, though others had been acquired separately. After the death of Gerrit Reynst, who drowned in the canal in front of his house, his widow sold a selection of the finest works in the collection to the States of Holland in 1660 for the then considerable sum of 80,000 guilders.

In 1660 this group and twelve Roman sculptures were presented to Charles II, augmented by four non-Italian works. The gift seems to have been organized by Amsterdam regents, especially the powerful Cornelis de Graeff and his younger brother Andries. The sculptures for the gift were selected by the pre-eminent sculptor in the Netherlands, Artus Quellinus, and the art-connoisseur Gerrit van Uylenburgh, advised on and accompanied the purchase. (Much later he was to flee from financial difficulties to England and become Surveyor of the King's Pictures to Charles, from 1676 until his death three years later.) The gift was unpopular with many of the Dutch, and became a bone of contention between the Dutch political factions.

In July 1660 Louis of Nassau arrived in London to find out more about Charles' preferences; his countrymen Simon van Hoorn, Michiel van Gogh from Vlissingen and the catholic Baron Joachim Ripperda van Farmsum arrived in November to negotiate the Act of Navigation and to present Charles II the Gift.

=== Predecessors ===
Previous diplomatic "Dutch Gifts" had been presented to Henry, Prince of Wales, in 1610, and to Charles I in 1636, the latter including six horses and a state carriage, four paintings, a fine watch, a chest veneered with mother-of-pearl and a precious lump of ambergris

== Italian paintings ==
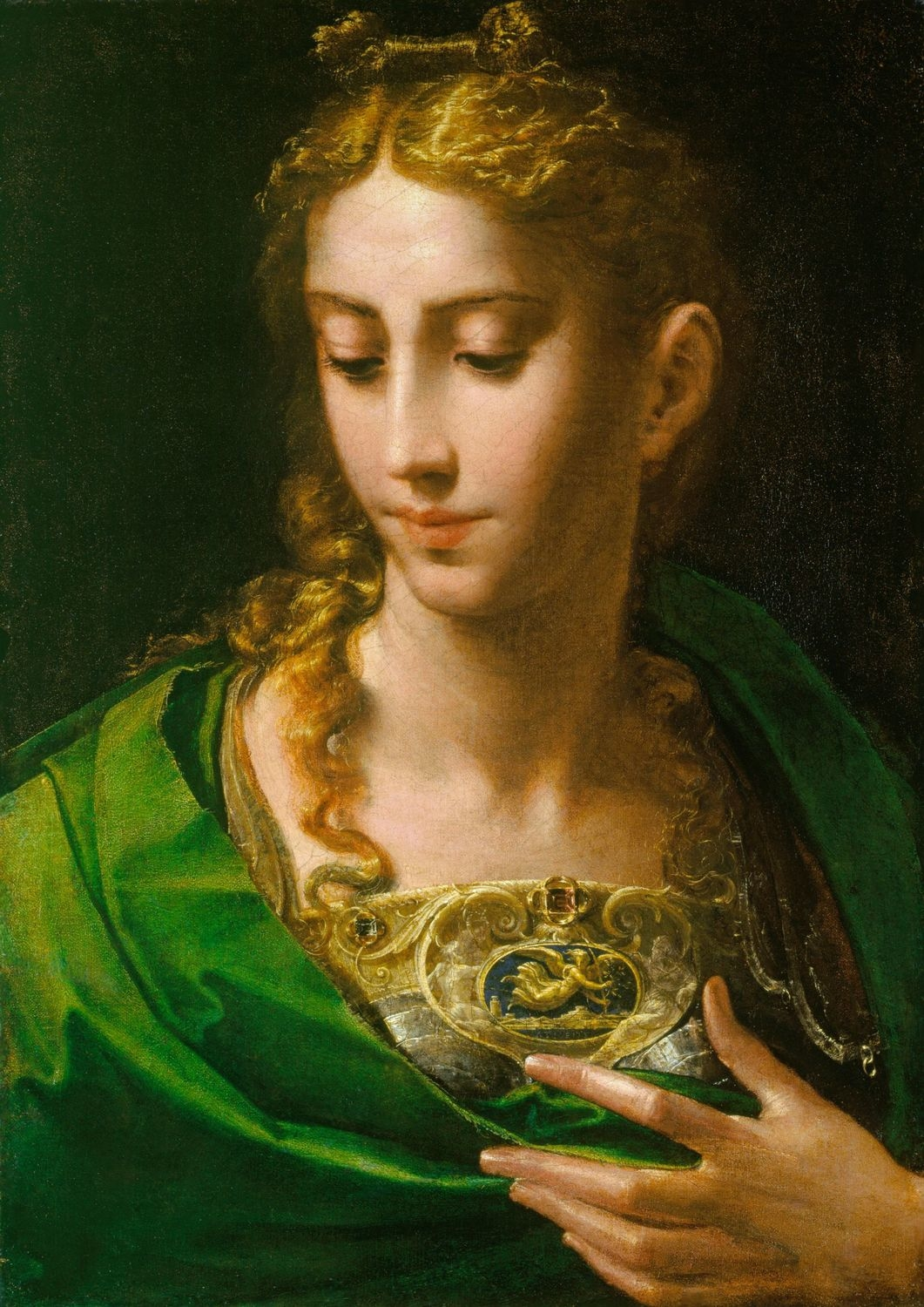
Parmigianino (Parma 1503-Casalmaggiore 1540) – Pallas Athena – RCIN 405765 – Royal Collection

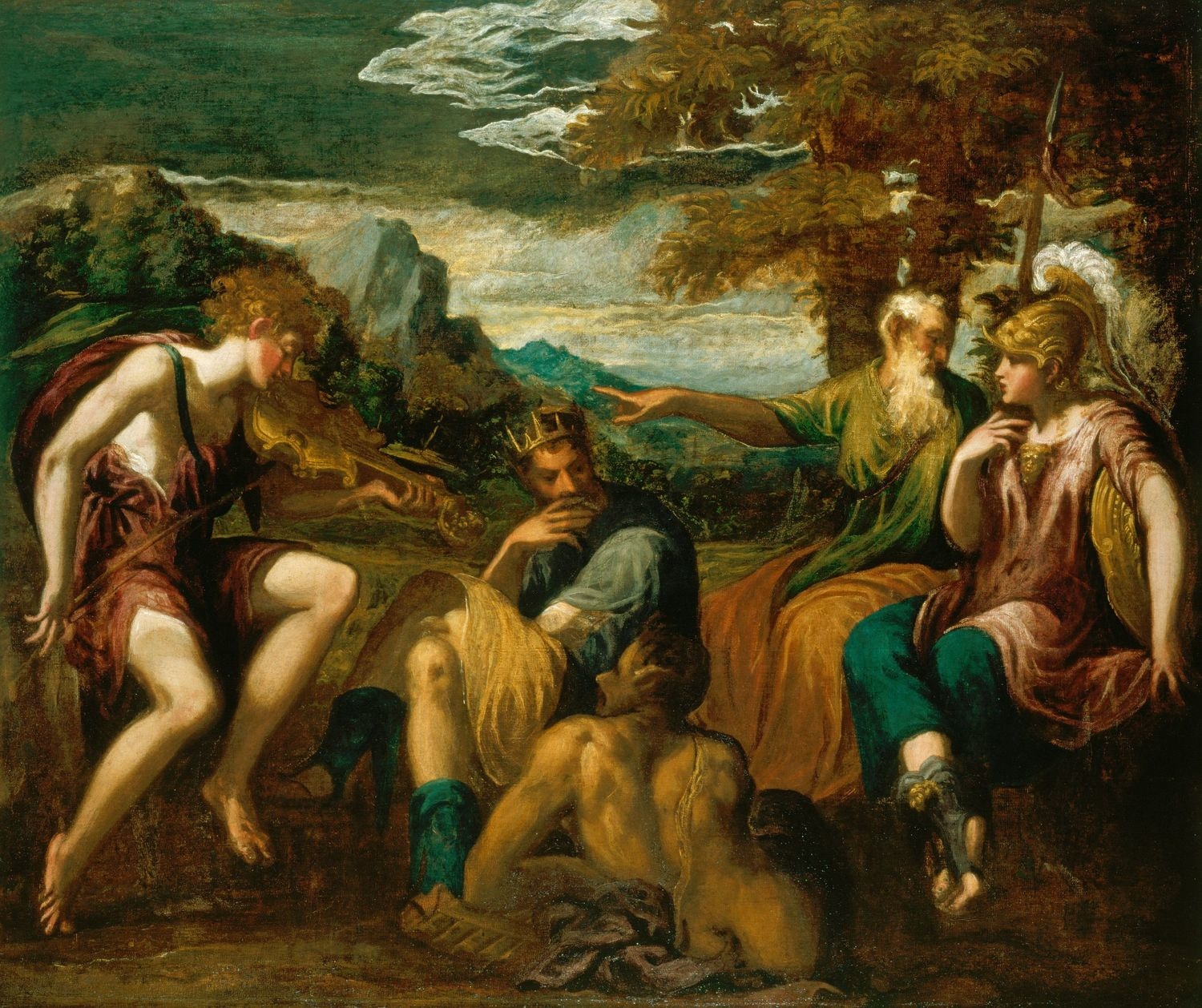
Andrea Schiavone (c. 1500–1563) – The Judgement of Midas – RCIN 402862 – Royal Collection

Fourteen important Italian paintings from the Dutch Gift, all previously in the Reynst Collection, remain in the Royal Collection, including:

- Titian's Portrait of Jacopo Sannazaro, c. 1514–18, and The Virgin and Child in a landscape with Tobias and the Angel (with his workshop, c. 1535–40) – this last was Charles' favourite, according to the Dutch ambassadors sent with the gift.
- Lorenzo Lotto's portrait of Andrea Odoni, 1527, and his Portrait of a bearded man, c. 1512–15
- Andrea Schiavone's Judgement of Midas, c. 1548–50, and Christ before Pilate.
- Giulio Romano, Portrait of Margherita Palaeologa, c.1531
- Parmigianino, Pallas Athene, c. 1531–8
- Paolo Veronese and workshop, The Mystic Marriage of St Catherine of Alexandria, c. 1562–9.
- Attributed to Vittore Belliniano, The Concert, c. 1505–15 (then attributed to Giorgione)
- Giovanni Cariani, Reclining Venus, the only work in the Dutch gift which can be traced back to the Vendramin collection.

The Reynst collection included a Genius of Painting attributed to Guido Reni, and the older of two old copies still in the Royal Collection is first recorded at Whitehall Palace in an inventory of 1688 and described as by Reni. It is now classed as "after Reni" though no Reni original is known. Whether this or an original work, formed part of the Gift cannot be confirmed, although one or the other seems likely.

Paintings no longer in the Royal Collection include a Guercino, Semiramis Receiving Word of the Revolt of Babylon (1624), now in the Museum of Fine Arts, Boston, which was given by Charles to Barbara Villiers, his mistress, or to their son, Charles FitzRoy, 2nd Duke of Cleveland. Jacopo Bassano's Christ carrying the Cross is now in the National Gallery, London, having been given to Catherine of Braganza, Charles's queen, after his death.

Two religious works, besides the Bassano, were recorded in an inventory of 1688/9 as being in Catherine's apartments, one "said to be Raphael" of the Holy Family with a lamb, and a group attributed to Titian of "Our Saviour with his feet on a cushion, The B. Virgin St John and St Elizabeth". These may have returned with her to Portugal in 1692.

== Other works ==
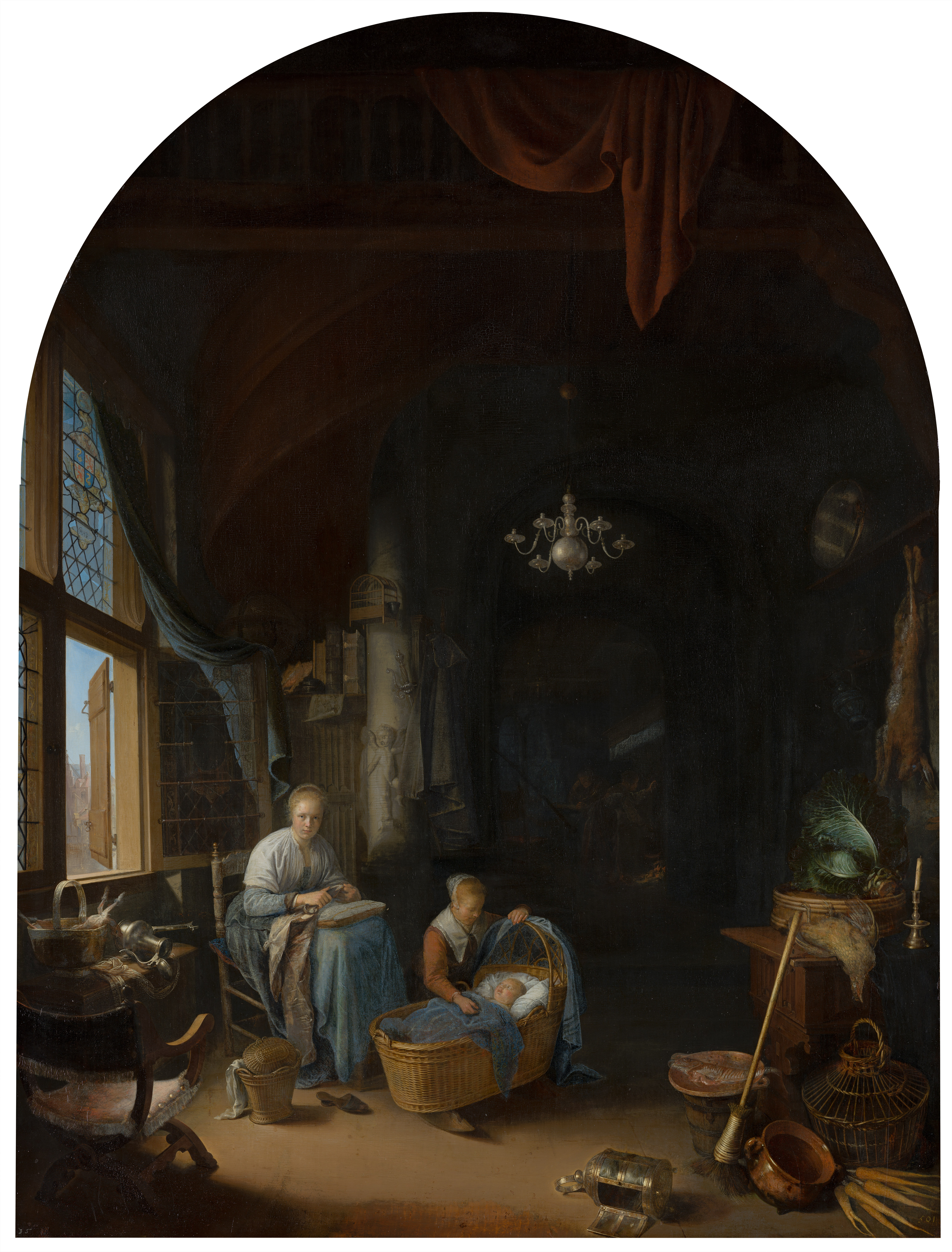
The Young Mother, by Gerrit Dou

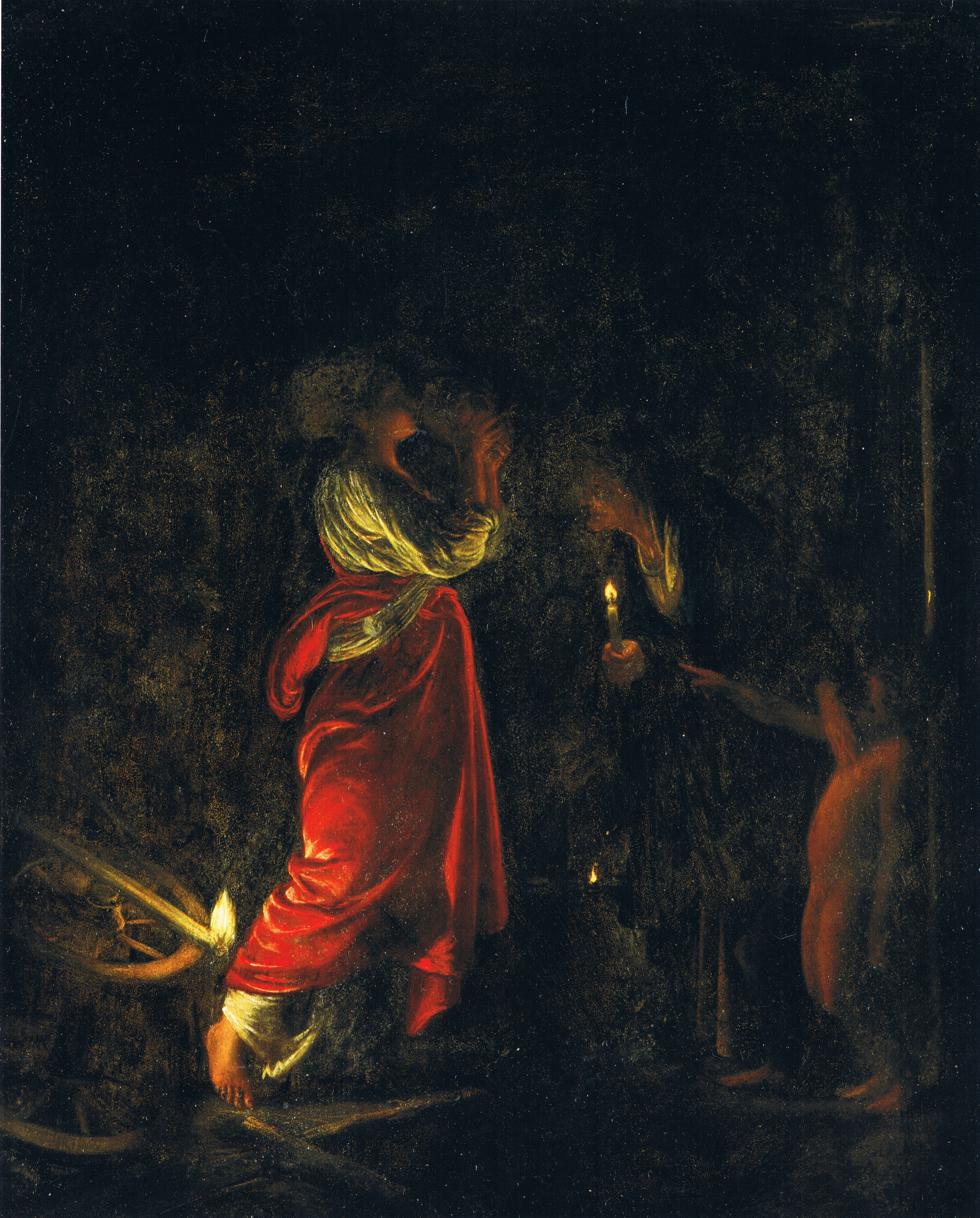
The Mocking of Ceres by Adam Elsheimer or a copyist

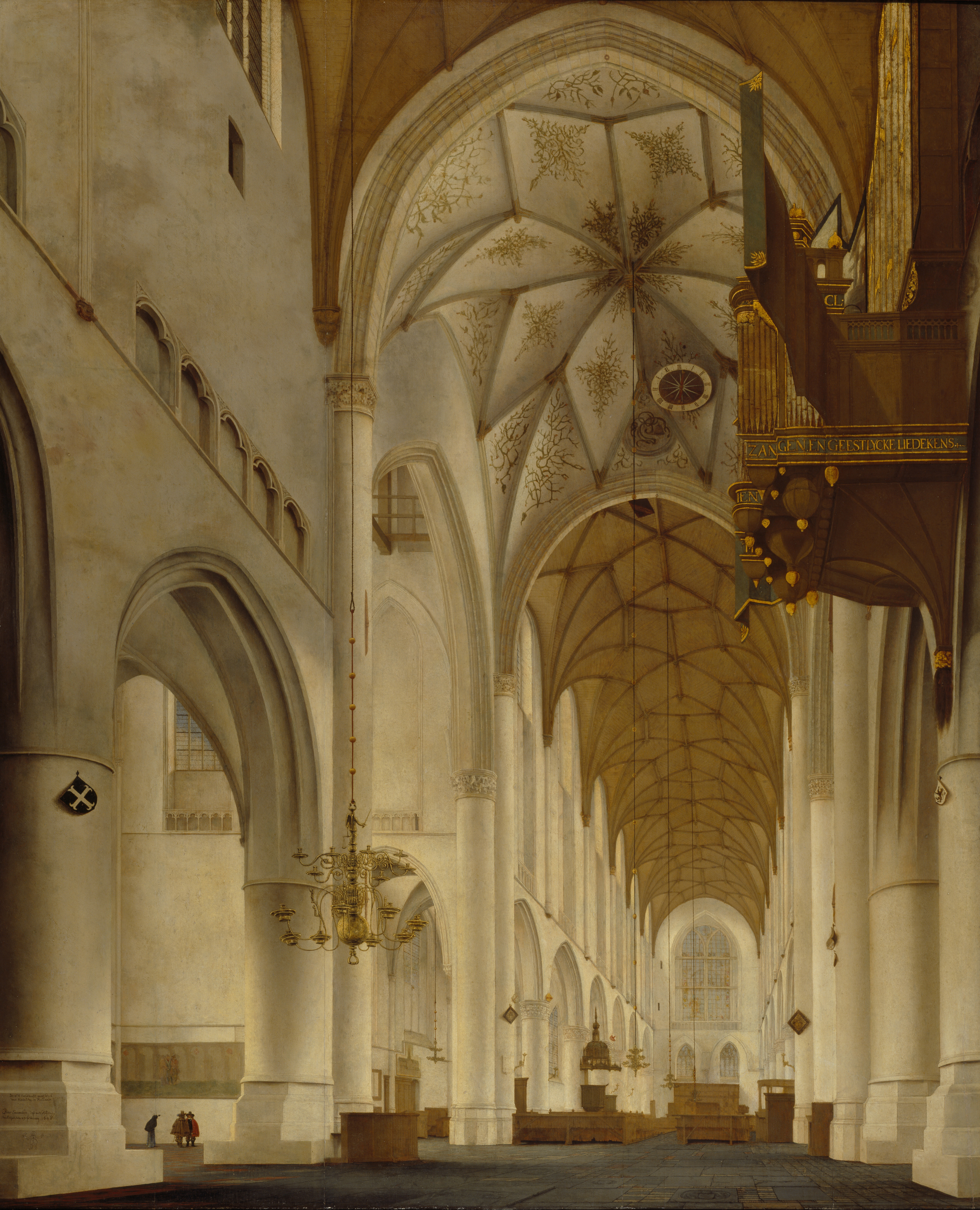
Pieter Janszoon Saenredam Interior of the Church of St Bavo in Haarlem (1648) Height: 200 cm (78.7 in); Width: 140 cm (55.1 in)

Of the four non-Italian works, two were by Gerrit Dou, one of which, The Young Mother (1658), was only two years old when presented. The regents of the city of Leiden may have chosen The Young Mother to augment the yacht Mary as a means to encourage Charles to look after the interests of the House of Orange in the Netherlands, which had lost effective political power in 1650. At the time of the Restoration, Charles' sister Mary was in perilous political waters as the guardian of her son, Prince William III of Orange. This was one of those works repatriated by William III and is now in the Mauritshuis in The Hague.

A heavily damaged version of The Mocking of Ceres by Adam Elsheimer (c. 1605), long thought to be a copy, but now seen as the original of this rare and important work, surfaced in the English art market in the 1970s and is now in the Agnes Etherington Art Centre in Kingston, Ontario. The composition is known from a copy in the Prado and an engraving, and the painting was still in the Royal Collection during the reign of George II. The damage was apparently caused by fire, perhaps in the 1698 fire of the Palace of Whitehall, when a considerable part of the Royal Collection was lost, probably including most of the statues in the 1660 Gift, though at least one of these remains in England.

The fourth non-Italian painting was a work by Pieter Jansz Saenredam, a recent (1648) and unusually large Protestant church interior of the Groote Kerk, Haarlem, which might have been intended to cement feelings of grateful nostalgia in Charles. This was apparently given to one of William III's Dutch courtiers, William van Huls, Clerk of the Robes and Wardrobe, as it appeared in his sale; it is now in the National Gallery of Scotland.

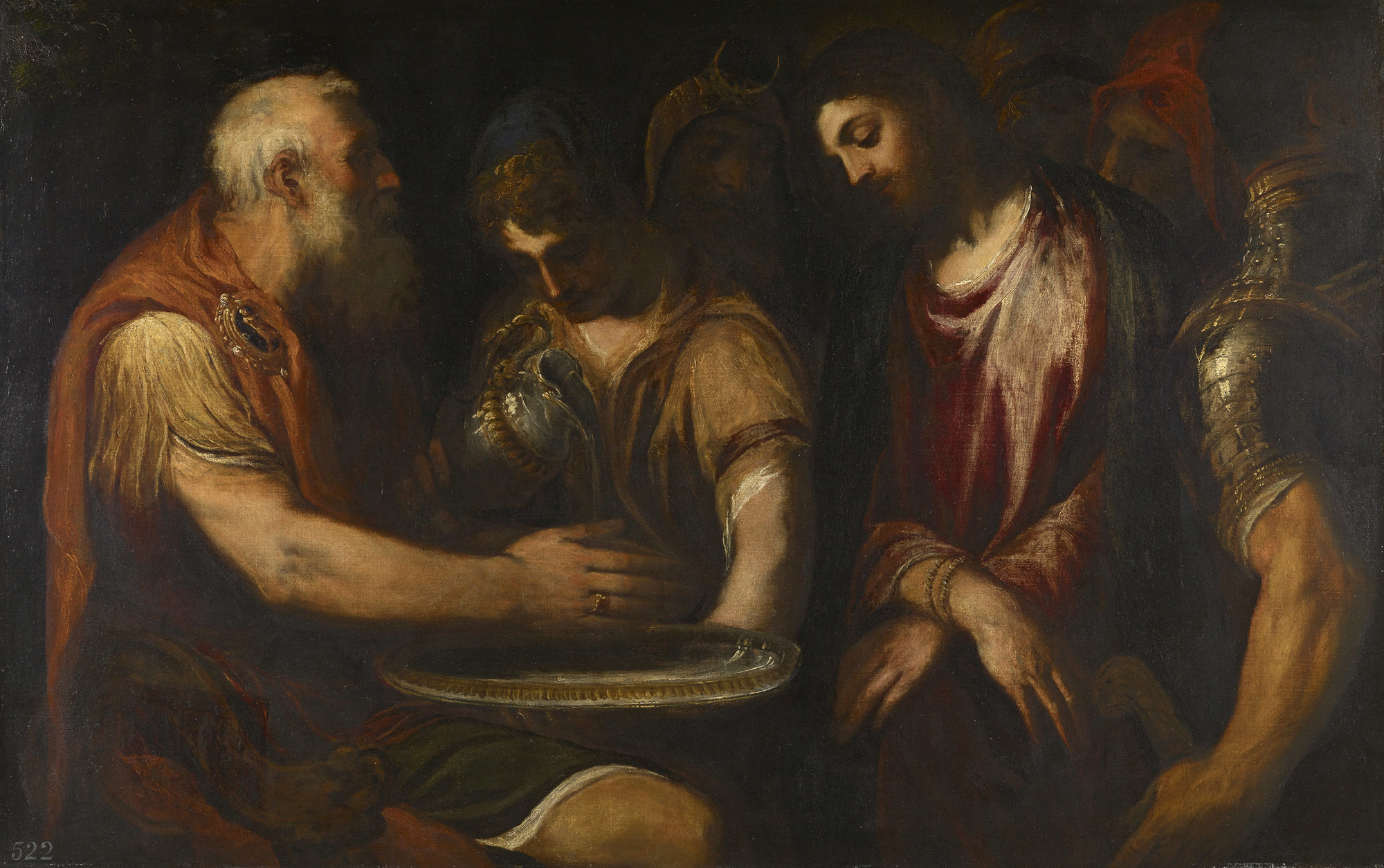
Andrea Schiavone (c. 1500–1563) – Christ before Pilate – RCIN 402802 – Royal Collection

The Gift included with a yacht, the Mary, a tapestry, and bedroom furniture which had belonged to Charles' sister Mary Henrietta Stuart. John Evelyn, visiting Hampton Court Palace in 1662, noted that "The Queen's bed was an embroidery of silver on crimson velvet, and cost 8000l., being a present made by the States of Holland when his Majesty returned, and had formerly been given by them to our King's sister, the Princess of Orange, and, being bought of her again, was now presented to the King." A very tricky issue was the education and upbringing of her son, the orphan William III of Orange.
