= Vittore Belliniano =

Italian painter

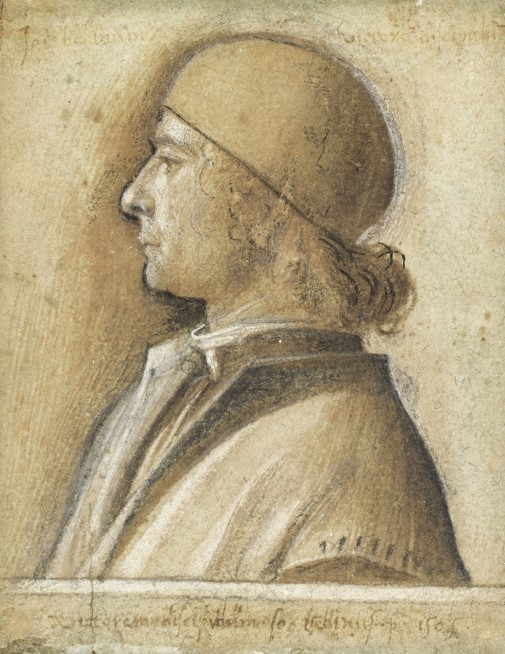
Portrait by Giovanni Bellini, 1505

Vittore Belliniano (c. 1456 – 1529) was an Italian painter of the Renaissance period considered to be identical with Vittore di Matteo. He was a native of Venice, active c. 1525. A student of Giovanni Bellini, he painted historical subjects, and several of his pictures were painted for the Scuola di San Marco at Venice and in churches of neighboring towns, like in SS. Vito e Modesto church, in Spinea.

== Works ==
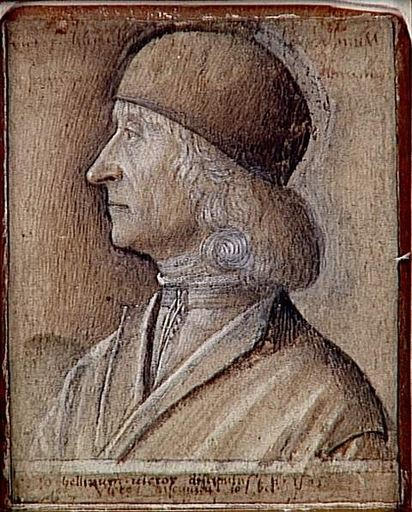
Portrait of his tutor Giovanni Bellini, 1505

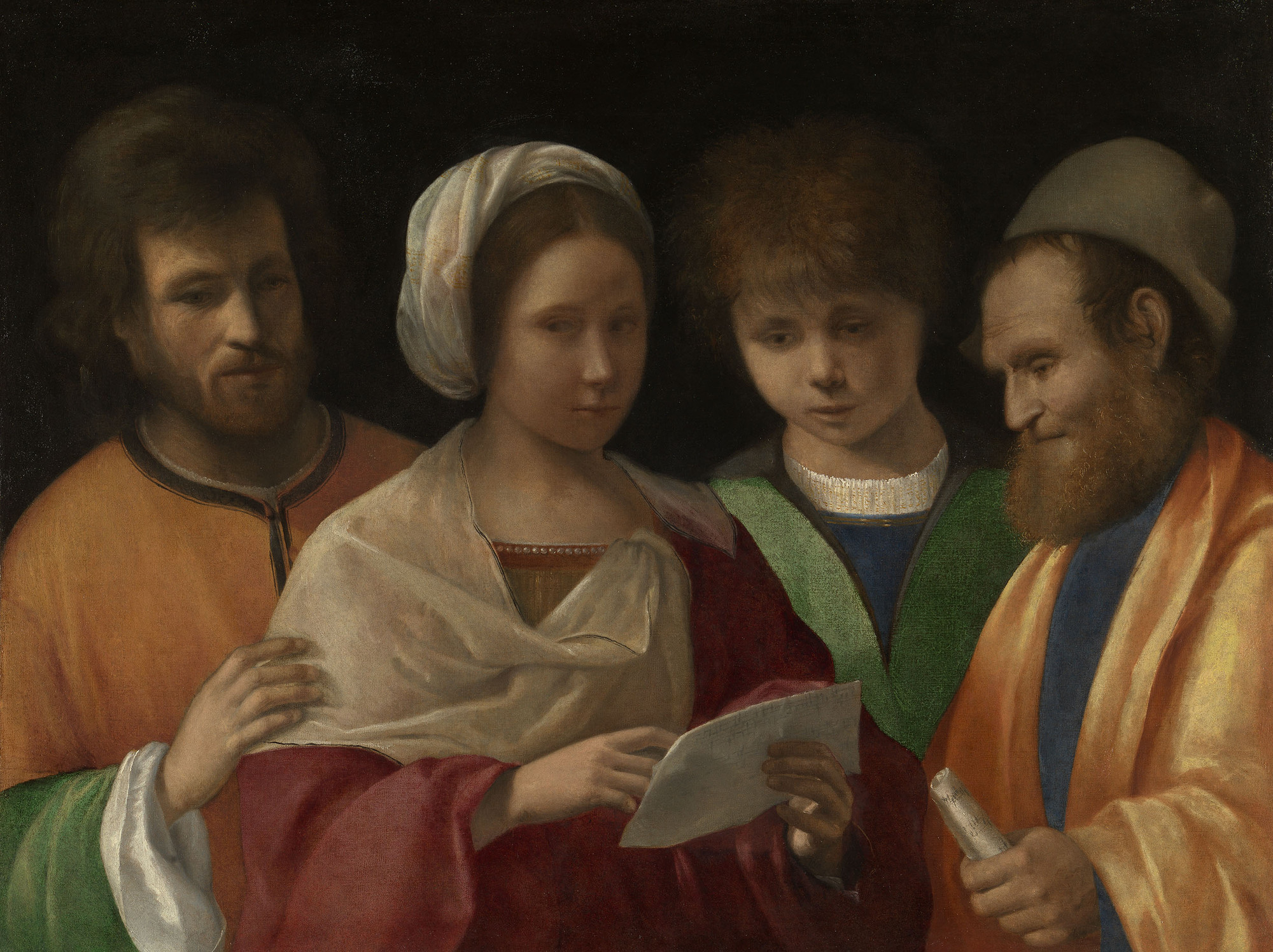
The Concert (attributed), c. 1505-1515

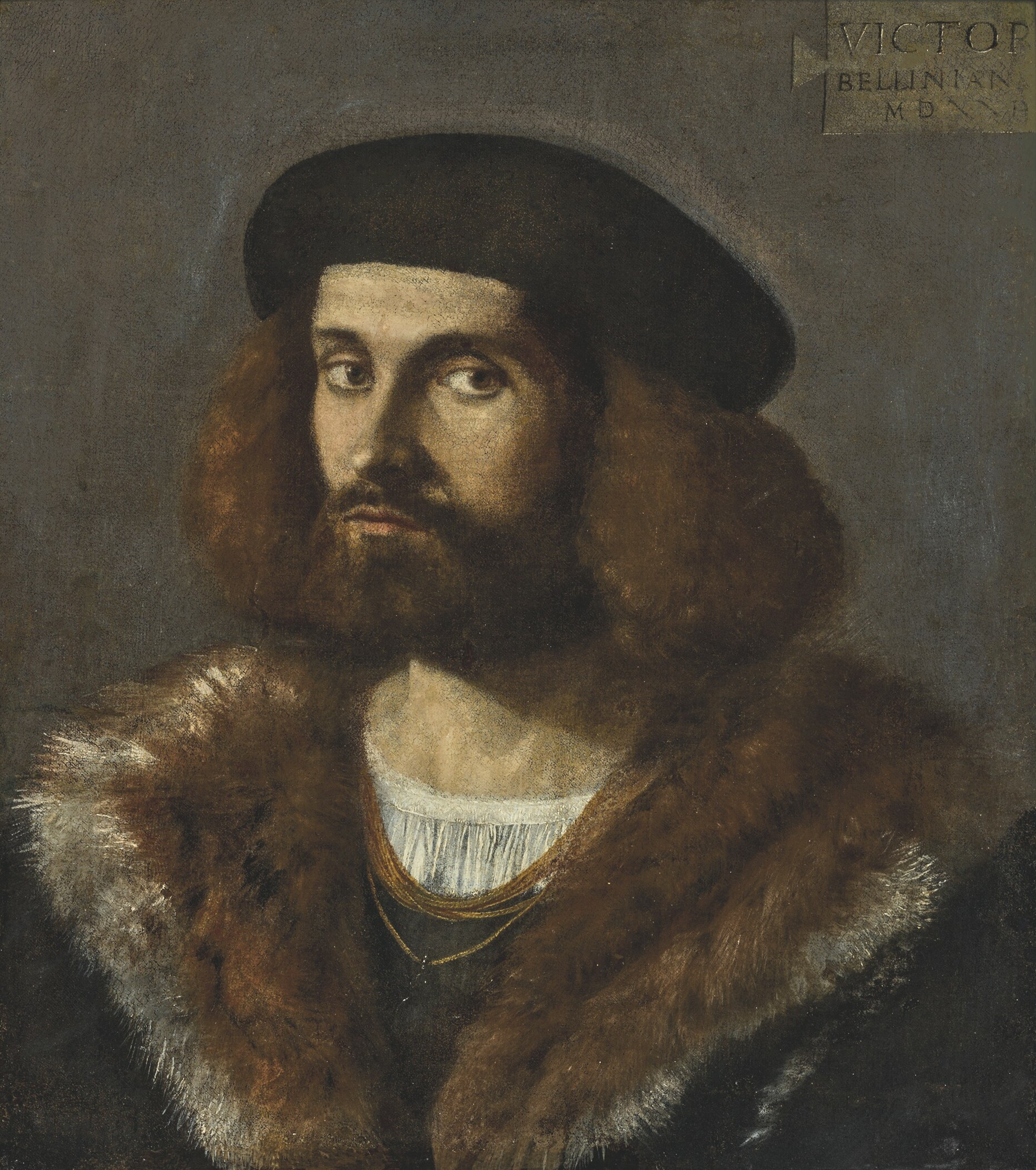
Portrait of a gentleman, bust-length, in a black cap and fur-trimmed coat, 1521

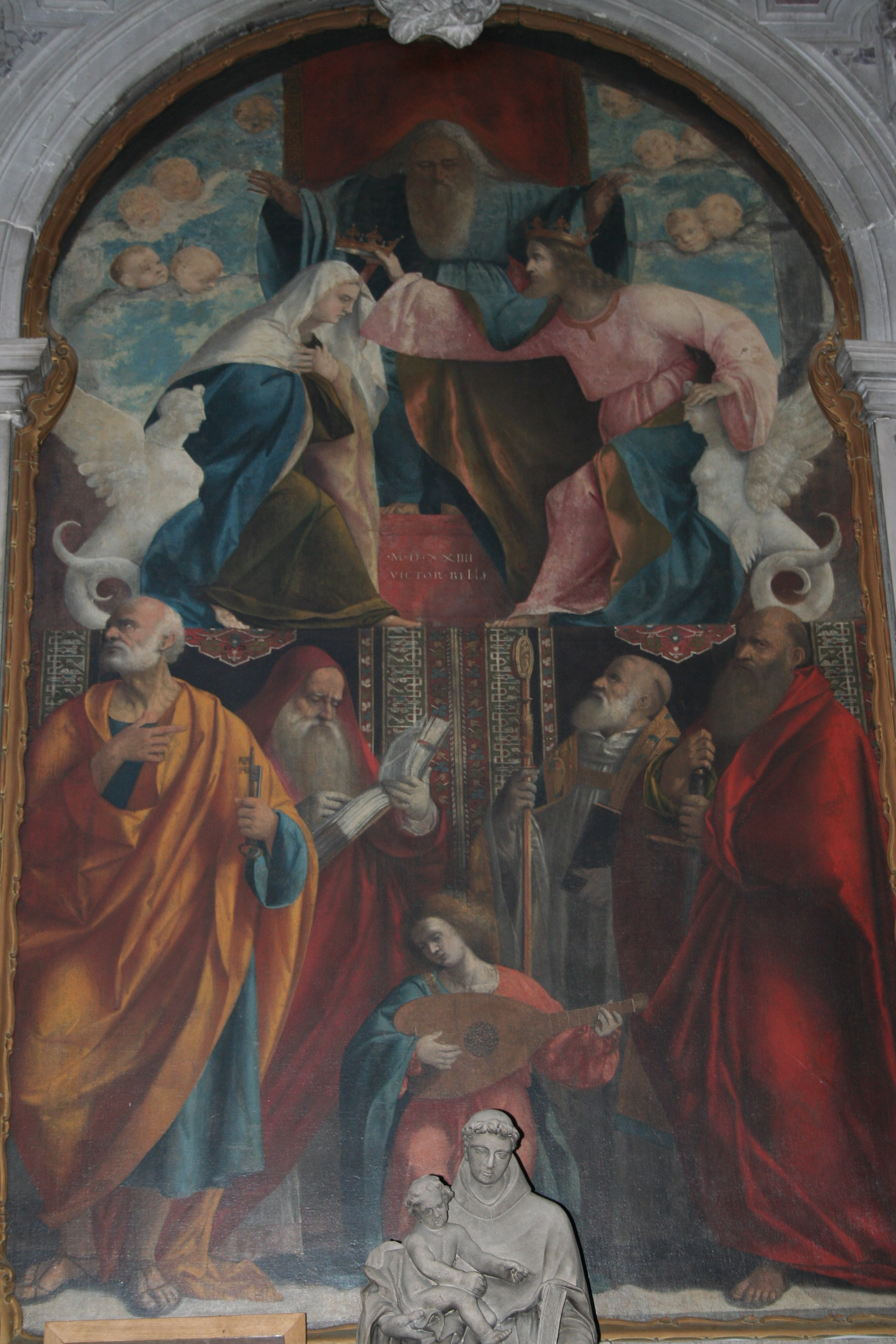
Incoronazione della Vergine, SS. Vito e Modesto church, Spinea (1524)
