= Reynst Collection =

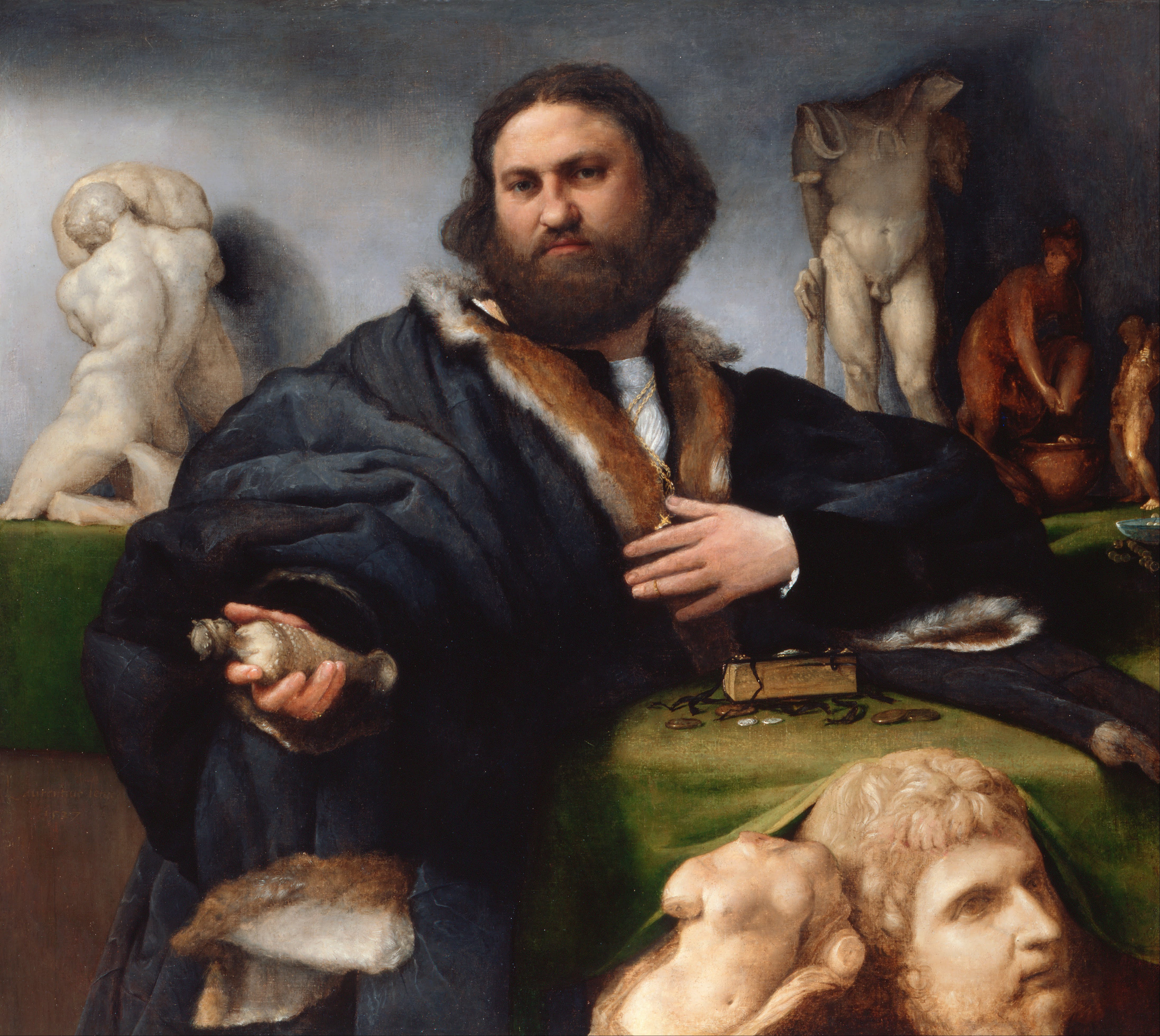
Lorenzo Lotto's portrait of Andrea Odoni, 1527. Part of the Dutch Gift, now in the Royal Collection.

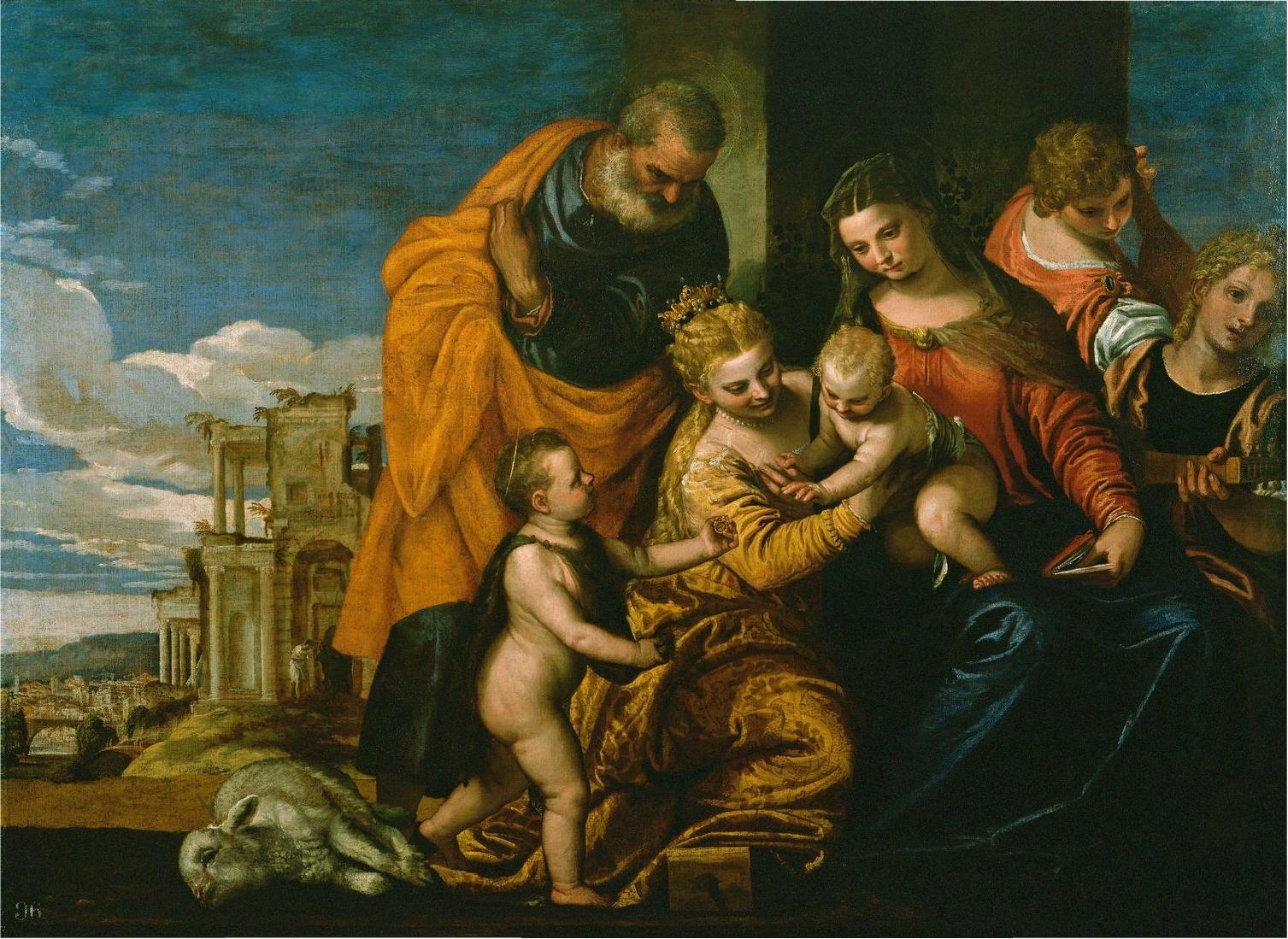
Paolo Veronese and workshop, The Mystic Marriage of St Catherine of Alexandria, c. 1562–1569. Also part of the Dutch Gift, now in the Royal Collection.

The Reynst Collection, probably the most extensive Dutch 17th-century collection of art and artefacts, was owned by the Dutch merchants Gerrit Reynst (also known as Gerard Reynst) and Jan Reynst. The collection was put on display in their house at the sign of Hope on the Keizersgracht in Amsterdam. It consisted of over 200 Italian paintings and over 300 sculptures, most of them ancient Roman. There were other antiquities: ten sepulchral monuments, five votive reliefs, nine cinerary urns, "Etruscan" vases, and Christian objects, as well as engraved gems. The collection was dispersed in the 1660s and 1670s, after both brothers had died, and Gerrit's widow sold parts to various buyers.

== History ==
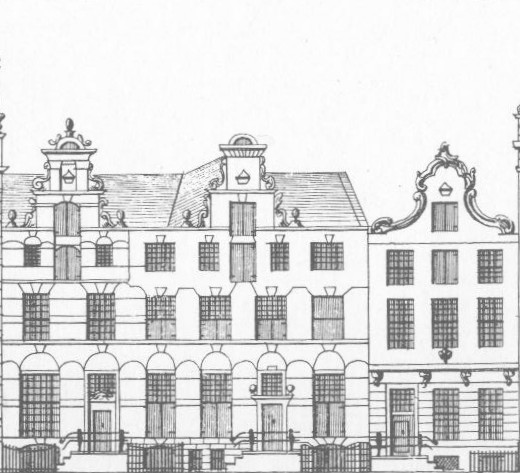
Keizersgracht 213 in the middle, a house known as Belief. The neighboring houses were called Hope and Love. Engraving around 1770 by Caspar Philips

In 1625 Jan Reynst became the representative of the family in Venice and was known there as Giovanni Reynst. He was impressed by the collections of wealthy Venetians and intended to build one of his own. Because Venice was in decline after trade around the Cape of Good Hope destroyed their monopoly, many merchants there sold their art collections. Jan Reynst, rather than patiently collecting for years, bought the collection of Andrea Vendramin (1556–1629) from Vendramin's widow. Vendramin had meticulously catalogued his collection in 1627. The items bought from Vendramin's widow, some 230 antiquities, about 140 paintings and curiosities of natural history—a true cabinet of curiosities—were shipped to Amsterdam and would remain the core of the Reynst Collection, though Jan Reynst continued to buy art in Venice.

Put on display in the family house in Amsterdam, the collection stayed largely together for several decades. A visitors list was kept, which includes famous people such as writer Joost van den Vondel and poet Constantijn Huygens. A statue, supposedly of Cleopatra, was donated to Princess Amalia of Solms-Braunfels after she had shown interest in it when visiting the collection; it was delivered the day before she received a visit from Marie de' Medici, whom it was doubtless intended to impress.

After both the Reynst brothers had died the collection dispersed. In 1660 the first sale took place, when the best pieces (24 paintings and 12 sculptures) were bought by the Dutch Republic for the large amount of 80,000 guilders. This part of the collection would become the Dutch Gift, which mostly remains in the English Royal Collection, who have 14 of the paintings, with other works now in museums. Three of the antique sculptures escaped the Whitehall fire (1691) because they were installed in the garden behind the Banqueting House. Other parts of the collection ended up in Germany and with other Dutch collectors. Some antiquities found their way to the Papenbroek Collection, and through there to the collection of the Dutch National Museum of Antiquities.

Around 1665 to 1670, after the collection was dispersed, engravings of some of the best pieces were finally published, the project having been initiated in 1655.

== References and further reading ==
- Halbertsma, R. B. (2003), Scholars, Travellers, and Trade: The Pioneer Years of the National Museum of Antiquities in Leiden, 1818–1840, Routledge, p. 6–10
- Logan, Anne-Marie S., "The 'Cabinet' of the Brothers Gerard and Jan Reynst" (Amsterdam, 1979).
- See Dutch Gift for fuller bibliography.
