= Cornelis Jan Witsen =

Dutch counsellor and mayor (1608–1669)

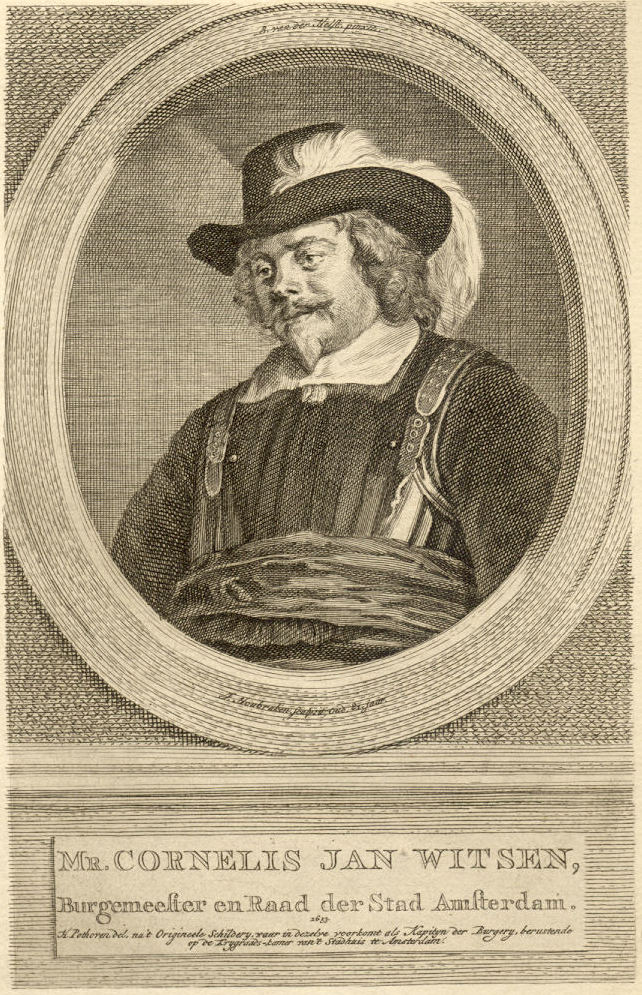
- Drawing of Witsen, by Bartholomeus van der Helst
- Baptised: 8 September 1605
- Died: 12 March 1669; Amsterdam, Netherlands
- Occupation: Politician

Cornelis Jan Witsen (baptised 8 September 1605 – 12 March 1669, Amsterdam) was a counsellor and mayor of the city of Amsterdam. He was the father of Nicolaes Witsen and the son of Jan Witsz(en) and Grietje Claes.

== Biography ==
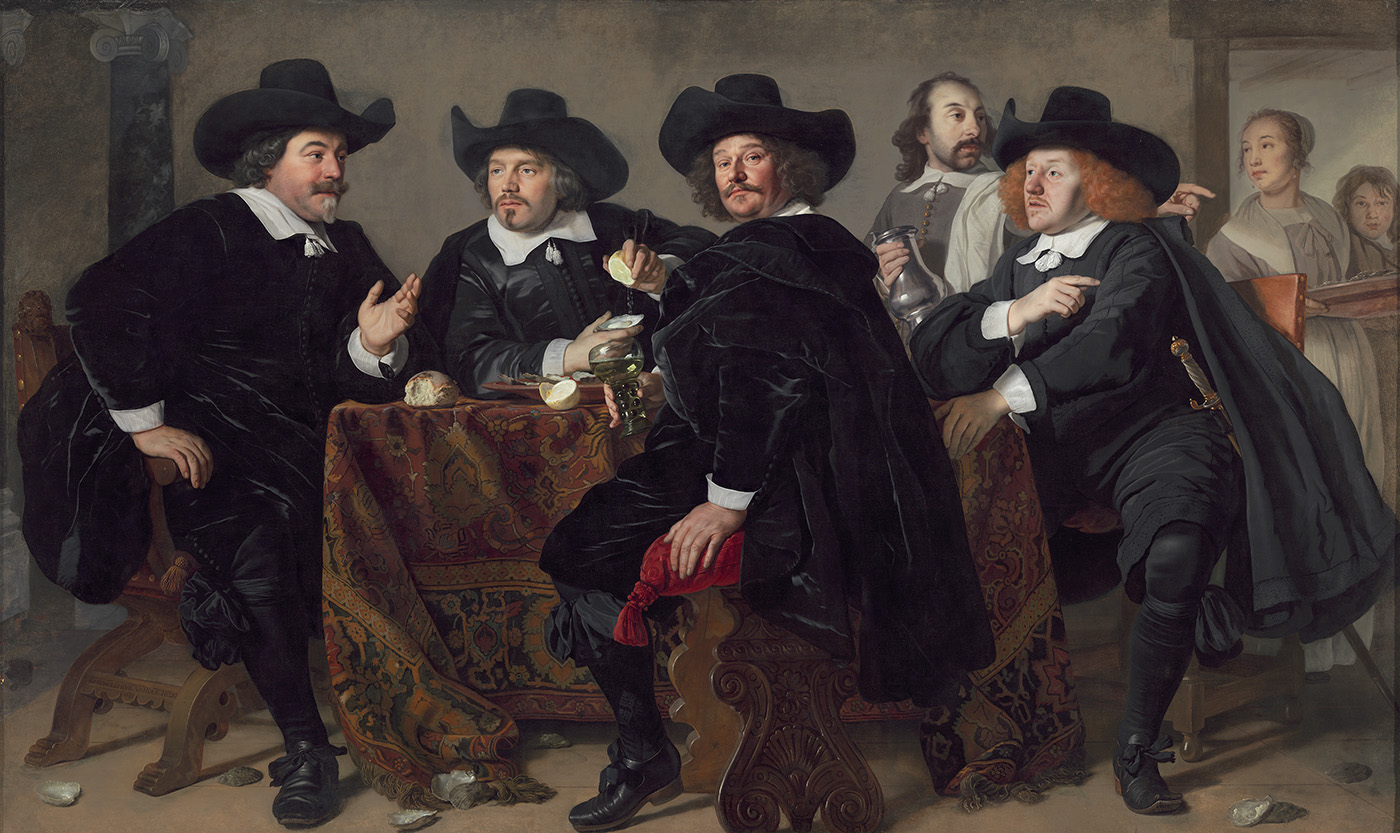
Cornelis (far left), with fellow aldermen, like Gerrit Reynst by Bartholomeus van der Helst.

The Witsen family was involved in the grain trade with Russia. He was baptised on 8 September 1605 in Amsterdam, and began his career as captain of the Schutterij and ended it as hoofdschout (head bailiff). In 1655, he was the administrator of the Dutch West India Company and had a seat in the Admiralty of Amsterdam. He was involved in the building of the Lands Zeemagazijn, now the Nederlands Scheepvaartmuseum. As a member of the Admiralty of Amsterdam, in 1656, he was sent with a diplomatic mission to England for talks with Cromwell at the laws on shipping. He took his 15-year-old son with him.

Witsen was a great patron of painting and supported the painter Rembrandt through his 1653 financial problems by providing him with a loan to buy a house. Five years later Witsen caused Rembrandt's bankruptcy by claiming back these 4.180 guilders.

Witsen kept a library and was best known for his central role in Bartholomeus van der Helst's painting Peace of Münster which also features a poem by his favorite poet Jan Vos. His engraving for Jan Wagenaar's History of Amsterdam was taken from his portrait in this painting.

The educator Comenius condemned him for supporting the proto-Enlightenment thinker Adriaan Koerbagh.
