= Fort Tolukko =

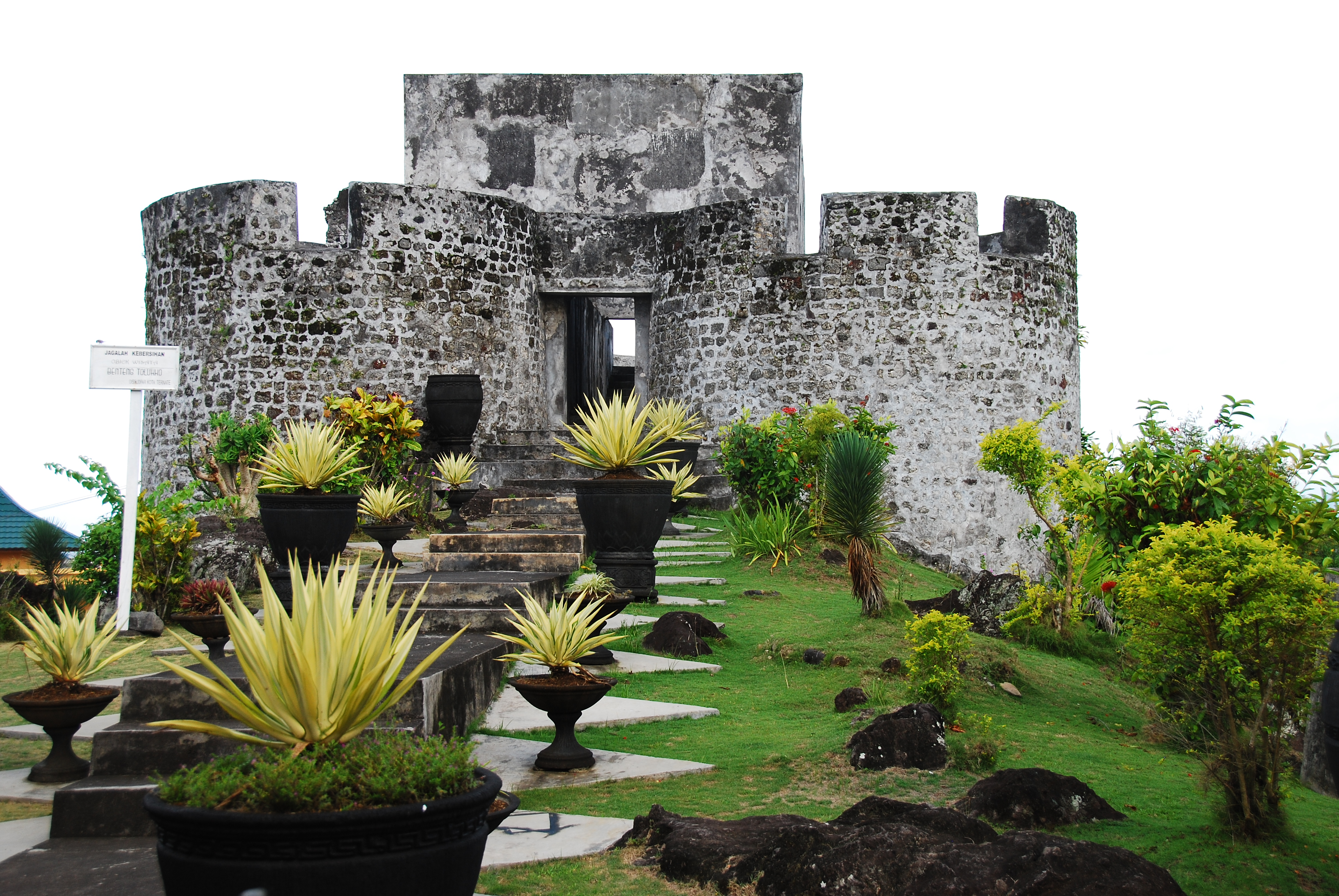
- Fort Tolukko

- Location within Indonesia

General information
- Architectural style: Iberian colonial
- Location: Ternate, Indonesia
- Coordinates: 0°48′50″N 127°23′17″E
- Construction started: 1522

Technical details
- Structural system: Stone built artillery fort

Fort Tolukko is a small fortification that was erected in 1522 on the east coast of Ternate facing Halmahera. It was one of the colonial forts built to control the trade in clove spices, which prior to the eighteenth century were only found in the Maluku Islands. It has been variously occupied by the Portuguese, the native Ternate Sultanate, the Dutch, the British and the Spanish. It was abandoned as a fort in 1864, renovated in 1996, and is now a tourist attraction of some renown due to its curious shape.

== Description ==
Fort Tolukko is located in the village of Dufa Dufa on the edge of Ternate City on the island of Ternate, one of the Maluku Islands in modern Indonesia. It is a 6 metres (20 ft) tall, stone built fort, sitting on a cape about 10.5 metres (34 ft) above sea level. Fort Tolukko's unusual phallic layout is a function of the immediate topography. Its small narrow layout with two bulwarks is distinctively Iberian, different from the Dutch built Fort Oranje and Fort Kalamata. Its primary function was to dominate a rare coral reef-free landing point, directly in front of the fort. It was built to hold a garrison of 160.

== Construction and early history ==
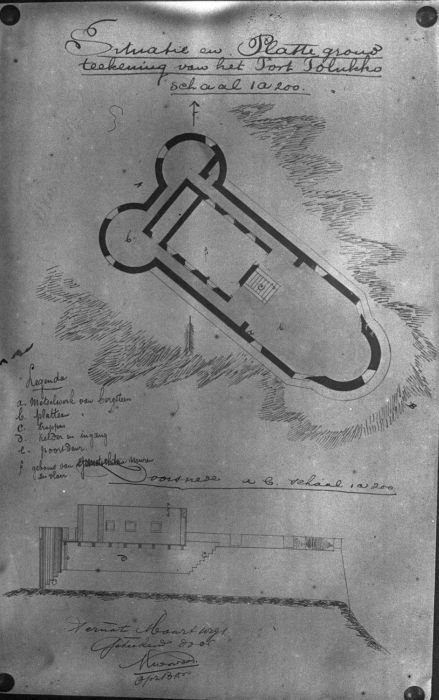
The phallic shape of Tolukko is more likely a function of the immediate topography than anything else.

After the arrival of Islam and the decline of Majapahit influence, the government organisation of North Maluku changed to a Sultanate by the fifteenth century, when the first Europeans arrived. Ternate was one of the so-called Spice Islands. Until the 18th century, cloves grew only on a few islands in the Moluccas: Bacan, Makian, Moti, Ternate, and Tidore. The trade in cloves and other spices from the Molaccas was a fabulously wealthy one and the European colonial powers competed to control it.

In November 1511, the Portuguese in Malacca learnt of the location of the Spice Islands in the Moluccas, and sent an expedition led by António de Abreu to find them. This arrived in early 1512, with Abreu going to Ambon while deputy commander Francisco Serrão went to Ternate. The Portuguese in Ternate was welcomed by the Ternate Sultanate, partly because the Portuguese promised to help the Ternatese in their fight against their rival, the Sultanate of Tidore, which was allied with the Spanish. The Ternate Sultanate allowed the Portuguese to build one fort in Ternate. In June 1522 they built one fort next to the sultan's residence in Gamalama (present Kastella). They called Fort of Sao Joao Batista (being founded on June 24, Feast Day of Saint John the Baptist).

It became clear to the Ternatese that the Portuguese intention was not merely to establish a trading port, but to monopolize the spice trade. This was formalised in a treaty which obliged the Ternatese to sell the spices as cheaply as possible to the Portuguese. In 1533, the Ternatese, led by Dajalo, tried to capture the Portuguese forts, but failed. António Galvão managed to calm the situation and maintain peace in Ternate, enabling the Portuguese to maintain their monopoly over the spice trade in the Maluku Islands. Their position was strengthened by a new treaty made in 1570 between Governor of the Moluccas, Lopez de Mesquita, and the Sultan of Ternate, Khairun Jamil.

However, not long after the treaty, Jamil was murdered on the orders of de Mesquita. Khairul's son Babullah declared war, which lasted for seven years. Gradually, the Portuguese fort were taken by Ternate and in 1575 the Ternatese managed to expel the Portuguese from the region. The fort of Sao Joao Batista was used by the Sultan of Ternate as a fortified royal residence.

== Later history ==
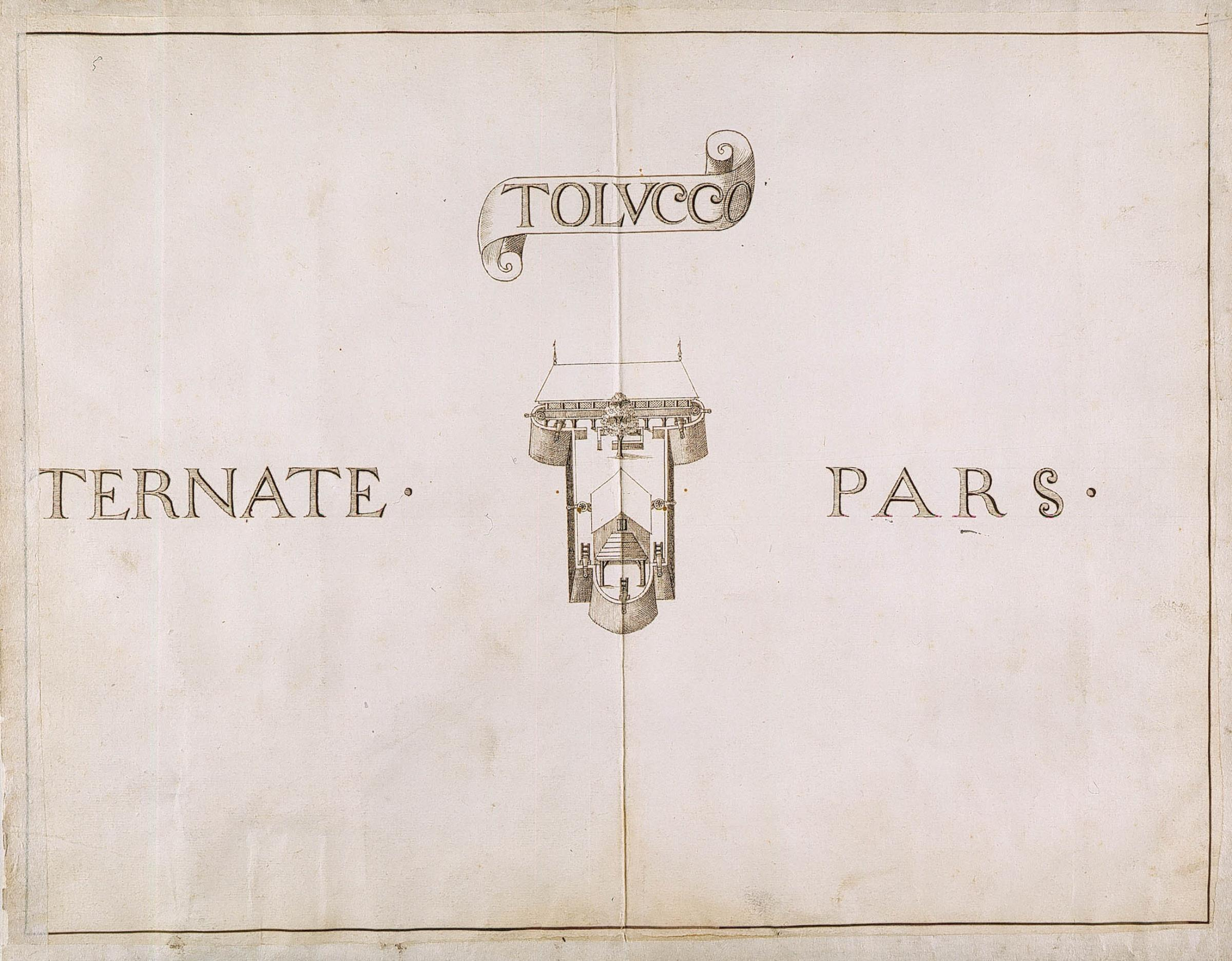
Fort Tolukko c. 1651.

The Dutch expanded in the East Indies in the early 17th century, just like the Spaniards did from the Philippines. In 1606 the Spanish settled in Ternate, on the old Portuguese fort of Sao Joao Batista (also called Gamalama where they found their new capital in Moluccas: City of Rosary). A year later the Dutch settled ten kilometers to the north, in the town of Malayo, where they founded a new fort called Fort Orange.

In 1611 Governor of Philippines Juan de Silva commanded a great expedition from Manila to Ternate with the intention of expelling the Dutch from the island. Once in Ternate, the Governor Juan de Silva, dispatched an expeditionary force under Captain Fernando de Ayala to conquest Fort Orange, so they decided to build the first fort above the local town of Tolukko, as they thought that from there, from the north, they could assault the Dutch Fort Orange. This new fort was called San Juan de Toluco.

Finally, the Spanish did not assault the Dutch capital in Ternate (instead of that they decided to start a military campaign on the east coast of Halmahera). With the Dutch fortress of Fort Oranje lying between Fort Tolukko and the main Spanish fortress of Kastella, the Spanish found it difficult to maintain Fort Tolukko, and it was abandoned in 1612. The Dutch captured Fort Tolukko in the same year, renaming it Fort Hollandia. It was repaired and improved by Jan Pieter Both for the Dutch East India Company. A few years later they gave it to the sultan of Ternate, so that he could establish his residence there.

In 1661, The Dutch government allowed the Ternate Sultan Mandar Syah of Ternate to occupy the Fort with his soldiers. At some point it was renamed Fort Tolukko after the tenth ruler of the Ternate Sultanate, Kaicil Tolukko, whose reign started in 1692. On April 16, 1799, a small group of Tidorese soldiers led by Kaicil Nuku, the nineteenth Sultan of Tidore, attacked Tolukko Fort. They were rapidly forced back by the combined forces of Ternate and Dutch East India Company. Continuous war between Ternate and Tidore greatly reduced the population of the city of Ternate, with many dying of starvation, being killed in the war, or fleeing to Halmahera. In 1810 the fort was occupied by the British during an invasion of the Moluccas during the Napoleonic Wars.

In 1864, the Dutch resident P. Van der Crab ordered the dilapidated buildings inside Fort Tolukko demolished and the fort vacated. In 1996, the fort area was renovated, but the lack of a proper conservation process resulted in the loss of some of the historic elements of the fort, such as the tunnels which connected the fort to the landing point on the beach.

== See also ==
- Fort Oranje
- Fort Kalamata
- Fort Kastela
- Otanaha Fortress

== Works cited ==
- Barry Kusuma (2015). "Benteng Tolukko" [Tolukko Fort]. Indonesia Kaya (in Indonesian). Archived from the original on November 15, 2015.
- "Benteng Tolukko di Ternate (Fort Tolukko of Ternate)". Jaringan Kota Pusaka Indonesia (Urban Heritage Indonesia) (in Indonesian). 2018. Archived from the original on 2015-11-15.
- Keppel, Jaap (2004). De Molukken. VOC Architecture Banda, Ambon, Leaser Eilanden & Ternate. Krommenie.
- Lobato, Manuel (2012). "From European-Asian conflict to Cultural Heritage". Portuguese and Luso-Asian Legacies in Southeast Asia, 1511-2011, Vol. 2: Culture and Identity in the Luso-Asian World: Tenacities & Plasticities: 186.
- Turner, Jack (2004). Spice: The History of a Temptation. New York: Vintage books. ISBN 978-0-375-70705-6.
- van de Wall, V.I. (1928). De Nederlandsche Oudheden in de Molukken. Martinus Nijhoff. p. 253.
