= HMS Mandarin =

Dutch gun-brig captured by the British Royal Navy

History

United Kingdom
- Name: HMS Mandarin
- Acquired: by capture, February 1810
- Fate: Wrecked 9 November 1810

General characteristics
- Type: Gun-brig
- Tons burthen: 178 tons bm
- Armament: 12 guns

HMS Mandarin was a Dutch gun-brig of 178 tons burthen (bm) and 12 guns that the British had captured at Amboyna in February 1810. She served as part of a four-vessel flotilla that captured Banda Neira. She was wrecked in November 1810.

== Capture ==
The British captured a number of vessels during the attack on Amboyna. One was the ship Mandarine, of 16 guns and 66 men, Captain Besman, that Cornwallis captured on 3 February after a chase of four hours. Mandarine had been out for four weeks but had captured nothing. Cornwallis suffered only one man wounded in the action.

Another vessel, captured on 15 February, was the Dutch brig Mandurese, Captain Guasteranus. She had 12 guns and was one of three vessels sunk in the inner harbor of Amboyna. However, the British raised her after the island surrendered. From her description, HMS Mandarin appears to have been Mandurese, with confusion arising out of the similarity of her name with that of the vessel that Cornwallis captured.

== Service ==
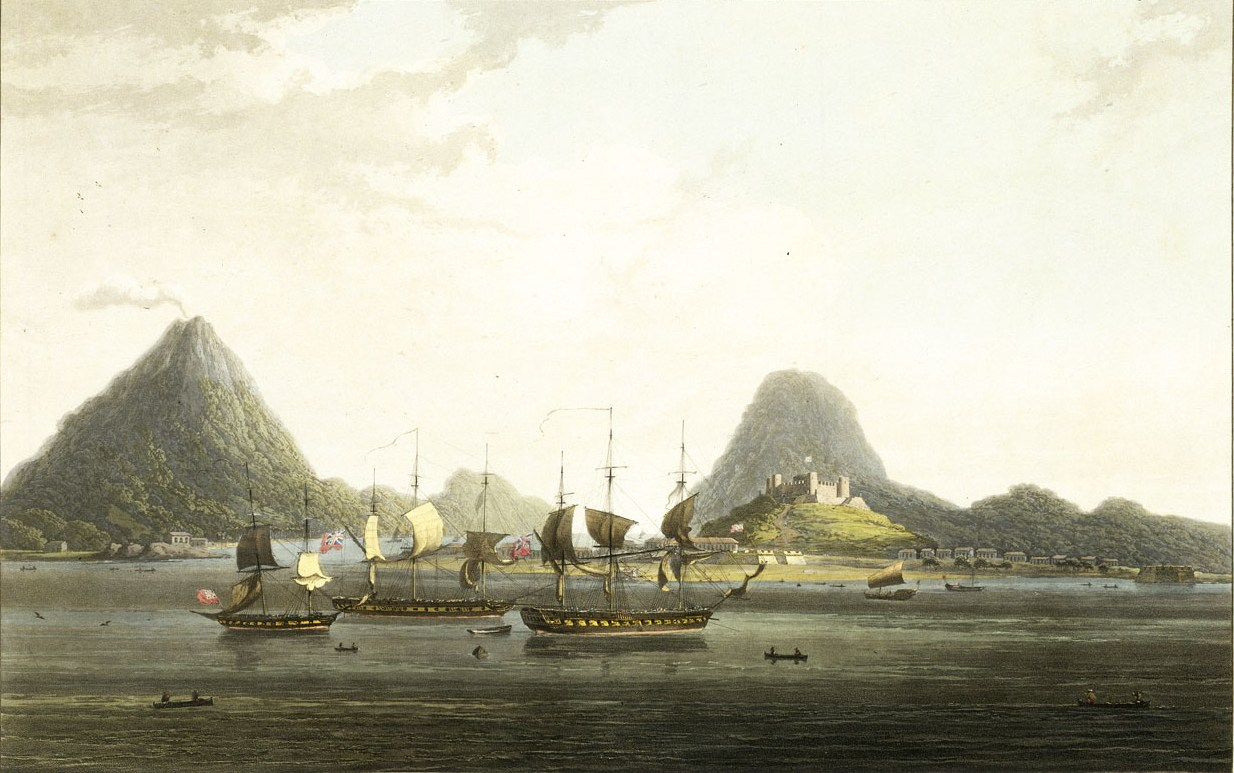
View of Banda Neira, depicting three of the four ships used to capture the island from the Dutch in 1810, from a sketch by Capt. Cole of HMS Caroline

The British commissioned Mandarin under Lieutenant Archibald Buchanan. From May to August, she took part in the Invasion of the Spice Islands, along with Piemontaise (or Piedmontaise), Caroline, and Barracouta.

Lieutenant Charles Jeffries (or Jefferis) replaced Buchanan at some point, probably well after August.

== Fate ==
Mandarin was wrecked on Red Island, near Singapore, on 9 November. Jeffries was carrying dispatches from Amboyna to Madras when his vessel struck an unknown reef in the Straits of Singapore. Jeffries saved the dispatches and he and his crew lived on the island until Chiffonne, which happened to be passing, rescued them.
