= Fort Kalamata =

Coordinates: 0.7623°N 127.3731°E

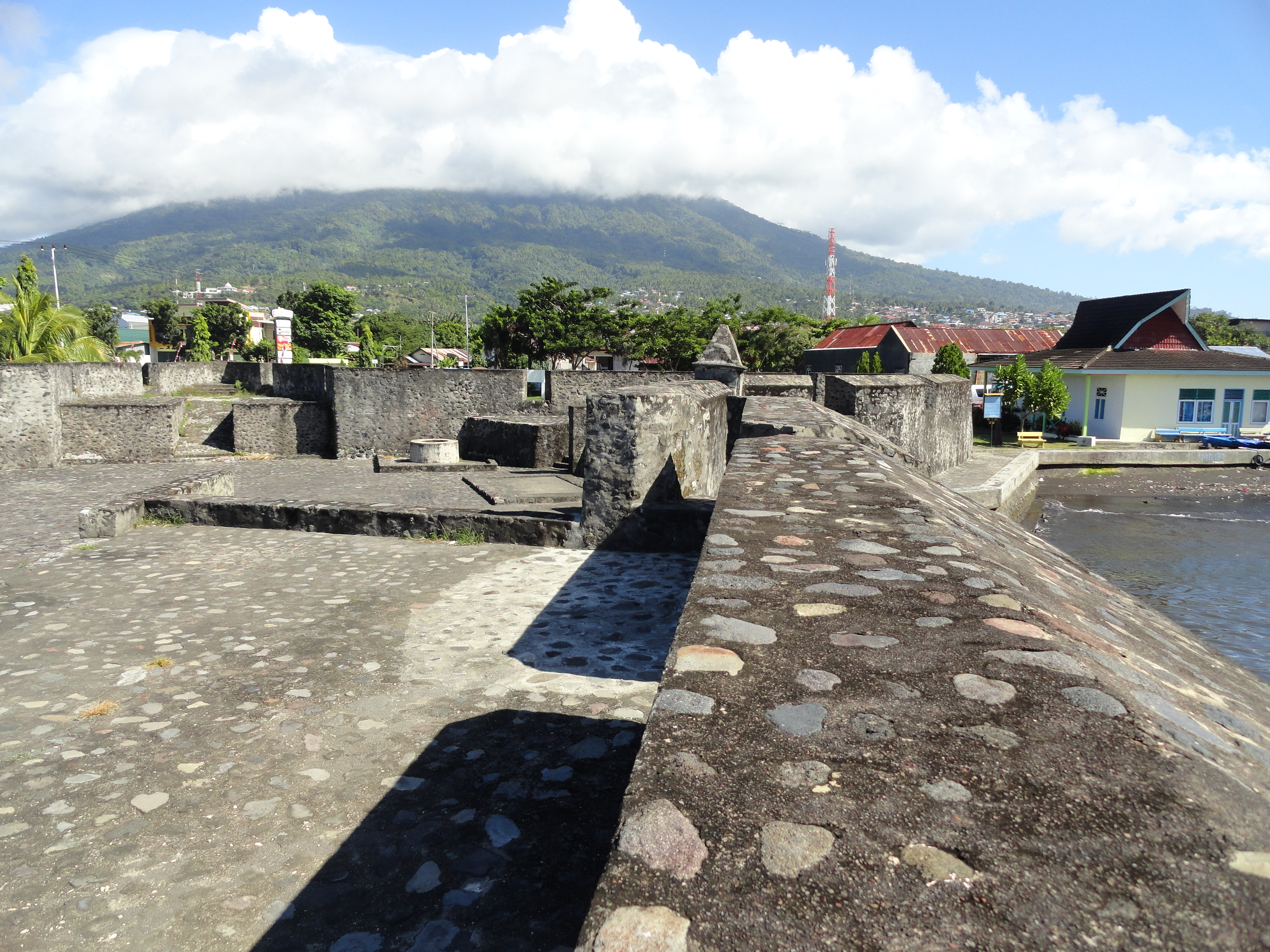
Fort Kalamata, Ternate, Maluku Island, Indonesia.

Fort Kalamata is a coastal star fort that was built by the Portuguese on the island of Ternate in Indonesia's Maluku Islands. Formerly known as Benteng Kayu Merah (Red Wood Fort) because it is located in Kayu Merah village, Originally the fort was named Santa Lucia, but later it became famous for Fort Kalamata. Kalamata itself comes from the name Pengeran Kalamata, the younger brother of the Sultan of Ternate Madarsyah

It is located at the south eastern corner of the island 1 km south of Bastiong on the edge of the water. It is now open to the public.

== History ==
Kalamata Fortress was first built by the Portuguese (Francisco Serrão) in 1540 to support of Portuguese efforts to monopolise the lucrative clove trade and to entrench their dominance over other European powers. Then, the fort was restored by the Governor General of the Indies Netherlands, Pieter Both in the year 1610 who became the dominant power in Maluku. Kalamata Fortress was occupied by Spain in 1625 after it was emptied of Geen Huigen Schapen (Portuguese). After being left behind by Spain, this fort was occupied by Dutch. Then this fortress was repaired by "Mayor Lutzow" in the year 1799. The fort was captured by the British when they conquered the Spice Islands in 1810.

Fort Kalamata was restored by the Government of Indonesia in 1994 and inaugurated after the full post in 1997. In 2005, Ternate City Government contemplated this game by adding yard and house to protect the fortress.

== Construction ==
Kalamata Fortress is designed to resemble four corners of the compass which has four pointed bastions and has a viewfinder. Kalamata Fortress is on the coastline and the back of the fort looks Tidore Island and Maitara

== See also ==
- Fort Kastela
- Fort Oranje
- Otanaha Fortress
- Fort Tolukko
