= Fort Oranje (Ternate) =

Fort in Ternate City, Indonesia

Coordinates: 0.7929°N 127.3870°E

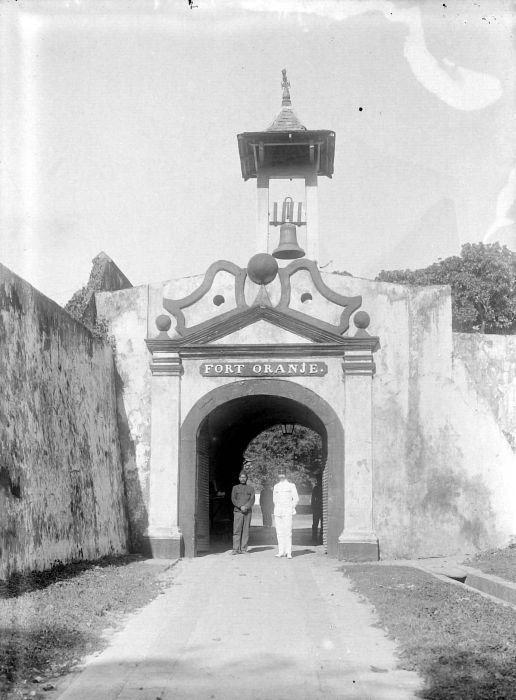
Entrance to Fort Oranje.

Fort Oranje is a 17th-century Dutch fort on the island of Ternate in Indonesia.

== History ==
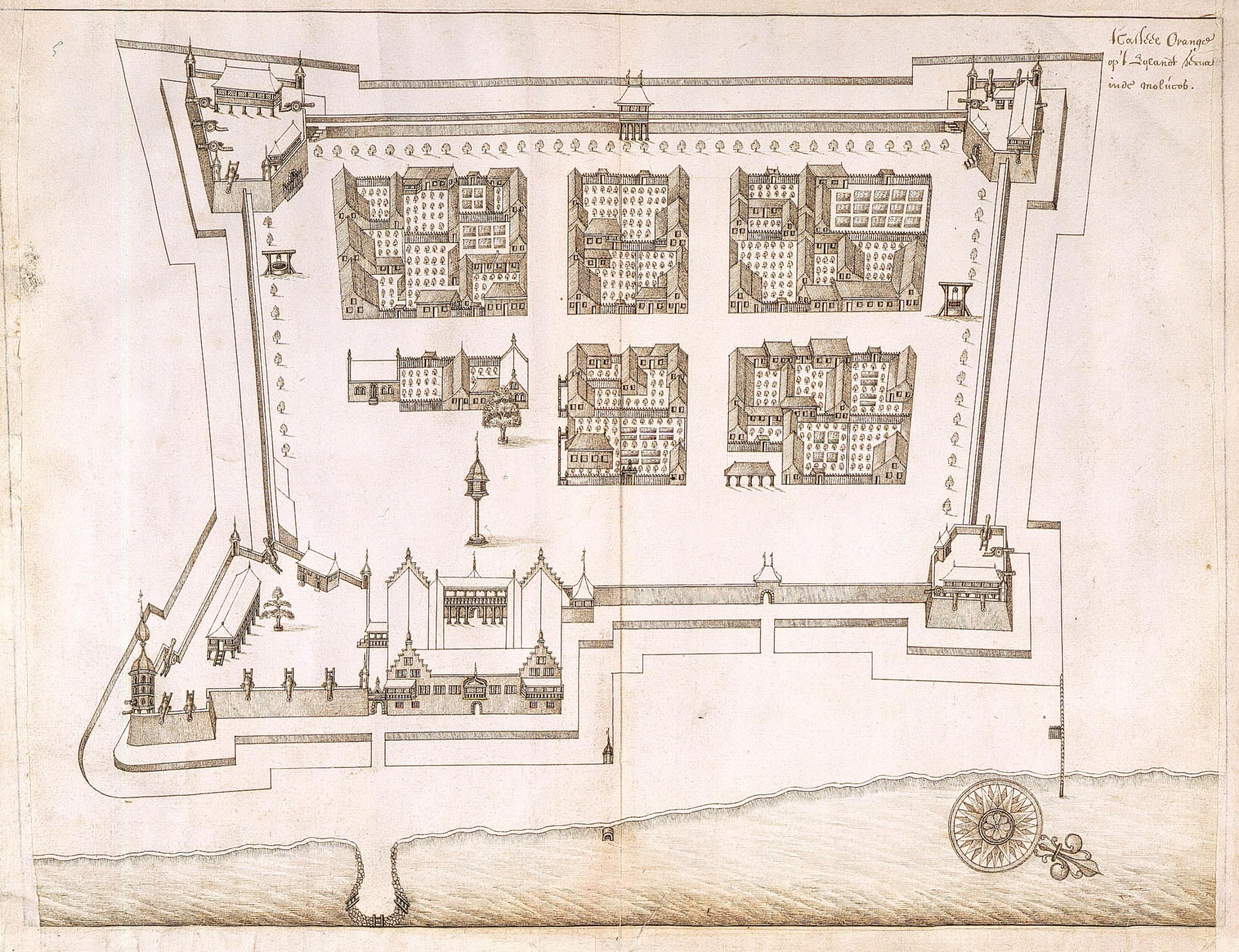
17th century map of Fort Oranje.

Ternate is a volcanic island in Maluku (also known as "the Moluccas") and is the seat of the Sultanate of Ternate. The island was once the world's single major producer of cloves, a commodity which allowed the Sultanate of Ternate to become one of the most powerful Sultanates in the Malay archipelago. The Sultanate of Ternate was in continuous conflict with the nearby Sultanate of Tidore. By the end of the 15th century the people of Ternate had adopted Islam as their official religion, mainly due to influence from Java.

The first Europeans to arrive in Ternate were the members of an expedition led by Francisco Serrão. Serrão had been shipwrecked near Seram and was rescued by local inhabitants. Informed by local Ternatenese, Sultan Hairun brought the survivors to Ternate in 1512 and gave the Portuguese permission to build a fort. Construction of the fort began in 1522, but the relationship between the Portuguese and the Sultan, having been difficult since the beginning of the treaty, had deteriorated over time. Following the assassination of Sultan Hairun, the Ternatenese expelled the Portuguese in 1575 after a five-year siege. European power in the region was weak and Ternate became an expanding, anti-Portuguese Islamic state under the rule of Sultan Babullah (r. 1570–1583) and his son, Sultan Saidi Berkat.

In 1599 two Dutch ships led by Commander Wybrand van Warwijck arrived in Ternate. In 1605 the VOC succeeded in driving the Portuguese out of Ternate but in 1606 the Spanish troops captured the former Portuguese fort and deported the Sultan and his entourage to Manila. In 1607, the VOC admiral Cornelis Matelief de Jonge helped the Sultan of Ternate to expel the Spanish from Ternate, so the Sultan gave permission for the VOC for the spice trade monopoly and allowed the VOC to establish a fort. This new fort, known as Fort Malay, was established on top of an undated Malay Sultan's fortress that had been damaged. In 1609, the first Dutch authority in Ternate, Paul van Carden, renamed the fort "Fort Oranje", after the House of Orange. Despite this, the name Fort Malay remained in use after several years later.

On February 17, 1613, the Board of Commissioners (also known as the Heeren XVII) issued the "Decision Letter" on February 17, 1613, setting the Maluku region as the center of VOC official position. Ternate and Ambon were chosen for the official residence of the Governor-General. This occurred when Pieter Both was appointed the Governor-General of the Dutch East Indies. At that time Ternate played a bigger role, and so Fort Orange became the official place for the Dutch East Indies Council to do their administrative work.

Fort Oranje remained the headquarters of the VOC until it was moved to Batavia in 1619. Around this time, control of Ternate was divided between the Spanish and the Dutch. Under Sultan Hamzah (1627–1648), the territory of Ternate was expanded. A number of territories were given to the VOC in exchange for controlling riots. In 1663 the Spanish left Ternate and Tidore.

In the 18th century, a governor of the VOC was set in Fort Oranje to control the trade in the area of North Maluku.

When the VOC went bankrupt, the possessions of VOC were transferred under the administration of the government of Maluku in 1800. Most of the possessions of the former VOC were subsequently occupied by Great Britain during the Napoleonic Wars and Fort Oranje was captured in 1810. After the new United Kingdom of the Netherlands was created by the Congress of Vienna, Fort Oranje was restored to the Dutch in 1817.

== The fort ==
Fort Oranje is the largest fort on Ternate Island. It is roughly rectangular in form, with four corner bastions, thick walls, a deep moat, and many cannon. Despite frequent earthquakes, most of the walls of Fort Oranje are still standing. Part of the southern wall collapsed in 2018, but has since been repaired. Major clean-up and refurbishment works were completed in 2019. The fort now hosts frequent public events and remains an important tourist attraction in Ternate.

== See also ==
- Fort Tolukko
- Fort Kalamata

== Works cited ==
- Borschberg, Peter (2015). Journal, Memorials and Letters of Cornelis Matelieff de Jonge. Security, Diplomacy and Commerce in 17th-Century Southeast Asia. Singapore: NUS Press. p. 87. ISBN 978-9971-69-798-3.
- Muller, Karl (1997). Maluku: Indonesian Spice Islands. Singapore: Periplus Editions. ISBN 962-593-176-7.
- Ricklefs, M.C. (1993). A History of Modern Indonesia Since c. 1300, 2nd Edition. London: MacMillan. ISBN 0-333-57689-6.
- Witton, Patrick (2003). Indonesia. Melbourne: Lonely Planet. ISBN 1-74059-154-2.
- Worrall, Simon (June 23, 2012). "The World's Oldest Clove Tree". BBC News. Ternate.
- Yamin, Fatimah (2017-08-21). Assifa, Farid (ed.). "Benteng Peninggalan Kolonial Belanda di Ternate Runtuh" [Dutch colonial fort in Ternate collapses]. Kompas (in Indonesian).
