= Christopher Cole (Royal Navy officer) =

British Royal Navy officer (1770–1836)

Captain Sir Christopher Cole KCB
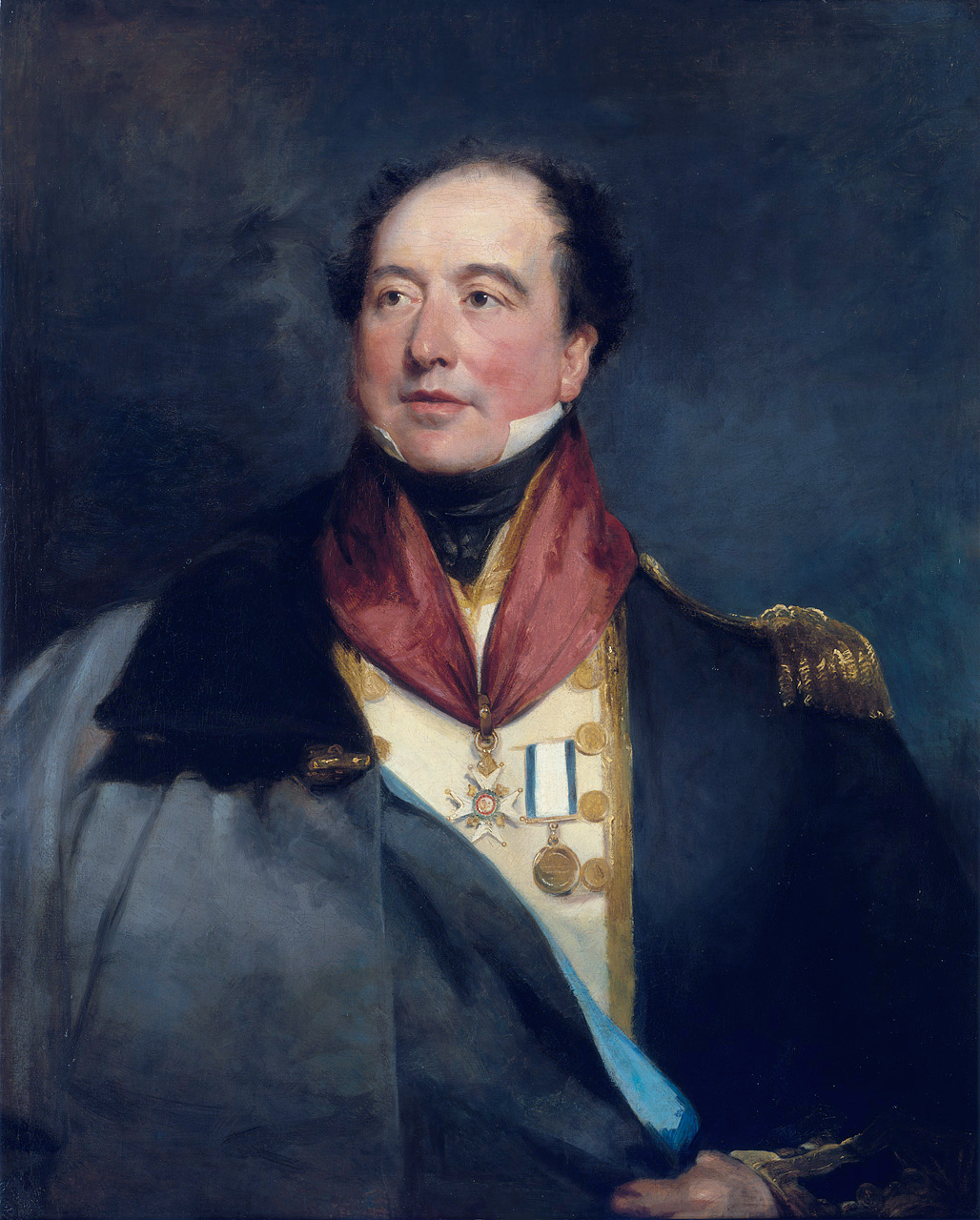
- Captain Sir Christopher Cole, Margaret Sarah Carpenter
- Born: 10 June 1770; Marazion, Cornwall
- Died: 24 August 1836 (aged 66); Lanelay Hall, Pontyclun, Cardiff, Wales
- Military career
- Allegiance: United Kingdom
- Branch: Royal Navy
- Service years: 1780–1836
- Rank: Captain
- Conflicts: American Revolutionary War; Battle of Fort Royal; Battle of the Chesapeake; Battle of St. Kitts; Battle of the Saintes; French Revolutionary Wars; Napoleonic Wars; Invasion of the Spice Islands; Invasion of Java
- Awards: Knight Commander of the Order of the Bath
- Other work: MP for Glamorganshire

Captain Sir Christopher Cole KCB (10 June 1770 – 24 August 1836) was an officer of the British Royal Navy who served in the American Revolutionary War, the French Revolutionary Wars and the Napoleonic Wars. Although he saw distinguished service in all three conflicts, he is best known for his exploits in the Dutch East Indies in 1810 and 1811, in which he was instrumental in the capture of the islands of Amboyna and Java. Cole's early career involved extensive service in the Caribbean Sea, operating against the French during the last years of the American Revolutionary Wars and serving in several large battles. During the peace that followed, Cole remained in the Navy and forged a working relationship with Captain Edward Pellew that would last two decades.

During his later career, Cole was commended for his service on operations in Surinam, and was praised in 1808 for his part in a successful diplomatic mission to Fath Ali Shah, the ruler of Persia, although the aftermath of the mission would lead to a breakdown in his relationship with Pellew, by this time the British commander in the Indian Ocean. In 1810, Cole was sent to the Dutch East Indies during a campaign to seize the Spice Islands and launched an attack on the well-fortified island of Banda Neira. Despite a disastrous start to the operation, Cole personally led a tiny force of men into the main fortress on the island and captured it, prompting a total surrender. This was followed in 1811 with an invasion of Java, which Cole planned and successfully executed. Highly praised and well rewarded for his service, Cole entered politics at the end of the war and twice sat as a member of parliament before his death in 1836.

== Early life ==
Christopher Cole was born on 10 June 1770, the son of Humphrey and Phillis Cole, in Marazion, Cornwall. In May 1780 at age nine, Cole was sent to sea to accompany his brother John, chaplain on the Royal Navy ship of the line HMS Royal Oak under Captain Sir Digby Dent. Royal Oak was stationed off North America at the time, participating in the American Revolutionary War, and Cole subsequently accompanied Dent to HMS Raisonnable and then HMS Russell, the flagship of Commodore Sir Samuel Drake in the West Indies. While serving on Russell, Cole was engaged at the Battle of Fort Royal in April 1781. In June 1781, Cole moved ships again, joining HMS Princessa with Drake. Princessa served in numerous actions over the following year, including the Battle of the Chesapeake in September 1781, the Battle of St. Kitts in January 1782 and the Battle of the Saintes in April 1782.

Following the Treaty of Versailles that ended the war, Cole remained in service aboard his brother Commander Francis Cole's 14-gun brig-sloop HMS Trepassey at Halifax. In May 1783, Cole moved to HMS Atalanta under Captain Thomas Foley and remained on board until February 1785 when he moved to the frigate HMS Winchelsea under the command of Captain Edward Pellew. Pellew and Cole were to have a lengthy and close working relationship over the next twenty years. Cole was in Winchelsea for three years before moving to HMS Crown at the recommendation of Drake. Crown was sent to the East Indies under Commodore William Cornwallis later in 1789, and Cole, who had passed his lieutenant's examination in January was frustrated by the lengthy delay in his promotion, occasioned by distance and the death of Drake in November.

== War with France ==
Cole remained in the East Indies for the next four years, moving from Crown to HMS Minerva under Cornwallis and in June 1793 becoming an acting lieutenant aboard HMS Bien Aime under Captain Richard King. In September 1793, more than four years after passing his examinations, Cole was finally promoted to lieutenant and the following year joined HMS Cerberus off Ireland under Captain John Drew, at the direct order of Lord Chatham who ensured that Cole was the most senior lieutenant aboard despite his recent promotion. In June 1795, Cole moved to HMS Sans Pareil in the West Indies under Captain Lord Hugh Seymour and in 1799 took part in the invasion of Surinam, for which service Seymour awarded him promotion to commander in the prize ship HMS Surinam.

During his time in command of Surinam, Cole achieved a number of successful cruises, including the capture of two privateers and the recapture of a merchant schooner in March 1800, and introduced new regulations aboard his ship that kept his men in good health in the Caribbean Sea. In 1801, Seymour died from a fever, but Cole's activities had already been noticed by Sir John Thomas Duckworth who replaced Seymour and Cole was made a post captain on 30 June 1801 in Duckworth's flagship HMS Leviathan, followed by command of the frigate HMS Southampton the following year. Shortly after taking command of Southampton the Peace of Amiens brought the Revolutionary Wars to an end and the frigate was paid off.

Within a year the Napoleonic Wars had begun, and Cole was returned to active service, chosen by Pellew, now a rear-admiral, to command his flagship HMS Culloden. Pellew was sent out to the Indian Ocean in 1804, and Cole remained with him there for three years, participating in the Java campaign of 1806–1807. The stress of service in the Far East caused the relationship between the two men to break down, and in March 1807 Cole took command of the new frigate HMS Doris. In 1808, Doris was detached from Pellew's command to escort a diplomatic mission under John Malcolm to Fath Ali Shah, the ruler of Persia. Throughout the mission, Cole remained at Bushire in the Persian Gulf and was rewarded for his service with the thanks of the Governor General of India and a £500 award, but his conduct was publicly criticised by Pellew.

Following Pellew's replacement by Rear-Admiral William O'Bryen Drury, Doris was sent to serve in the Strait of Malacca, on a mission to obtain a working relationship with the Spanish government in the Philippines. For his successful efforts he was given command of the frigate HMS Caroline in 1809 and the following year was given command of a squadron with which to attack the Molucca Islands on a free commission.

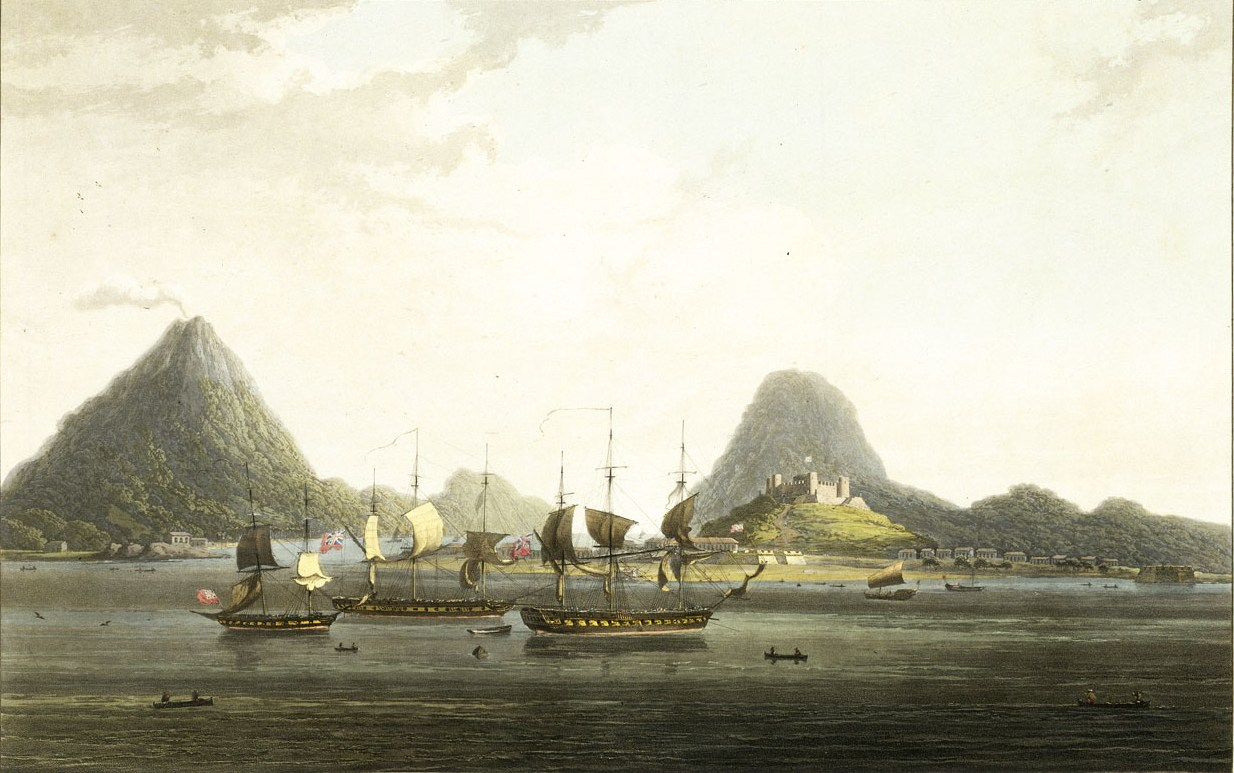
View of Banda Neira, depicting three of the four ships used to capture the island from the Dutch in 1810, from a sketch by Cole in command of HMS Caroline

Sailing to the well-defended island of Banda Neira, Cole planned an audacious attack on 10 August 1810, his troops storming the fortress and successfully capturing it. The following year he took a leading role in the planning of the invasion of Java, which was successfully completed under Rear-Admiral Robert Stopford. For his services, he was knighted in May 1812, awarded a specially minted medal and given an honorary doctorate by the University of Oxford.

In 1813, Cole returned to Europe and took command of the ship of the line HMS Rippon in the Channel Fleet. In October 1813 he captured the damaged French frigate Weser, and in February 1814 he recaptured an extremely valuable Spanish treasure ship previously seized by a French warship. On 1 September 1814, Rippon was decommissioned and Cole's career at sea came to an end after 34 years on continual service.

== Politics and retirement ==
As a reward for his services, Cole was made a Knight Commander of the Order of the Bath in 1815 and at the conclusion of the Napoleonic Wars in the same year, was presented with the Order of Maria Theresa by the Austrian Empire and the Order of St George by the Russian Empire.

He married Mary Lucy, daughter of Lord Ilchester and widow of Welsh landowner Thomas Mansel Talbot, with whom he had long been connected. The couple had no children, although Mary had six surviving children from her first marriage. His fame in Britain for the Banda Neira operation was enough to see him elected as a member of parliament in 1817 for the Glamorganshire seat, although he lost the seat the following year. In 1820 he was elected again, retaining the seat until 1830 when he made way for his stepson Christopher Rice Mansel Talbot. The Navy honoured his service with command of the royal yacht HMY Royal Sovereign in 1828 and a position as a colonel of Royal Marines in 1830.

He died in August 1836 at his home Lanelay Hall, Pontyclun, near Cardiff, Wales. He is buried in the graveyard of St Andrew's Church, Penrice on the Gower peninsula, adjacent to his wife's previous family home, Penrice Castle. His wife survived until 1855, and his stepson spent sixty years in parliament.

== Arms ==
Coat of arms of Sir Christopher Cole
Crest Out of a naval crown Or a demi-dragon rampant Vert and Gules, charged on the body with three annulets Or, and holding a staff, hanging from which is a flag barry of three Gules, Argent and Azure, the Argent charged with the word BANDA in Sable; above the flag at the peak a pennon of St. George. Helm A knight's helm. Escutcheon Ermine, a bull statant at gaze Gules, on a bend Azure a scaling ladder Or, all within a bordure Sable charged with four roundels between four annulets Or, and on a canton Or a mount vert and thereon a castle with five towers Proper, surmounted by the name BELGICA in Sable. The shield is encircled by the circlet, with badge pendant, of a Knight Commander of the Order of the Bath, military division. Motto Deum Cole, Regem Serva Orders The Most Honourable Order of the Bath (Knight Commander - KCB)

== See also ==
- John Cole (1758–1819), his brother

== Notes ==
Parliament of the United Kingdom
Preceded by Benjamin Hall	Member of Parliament for Glamorganshire; 1817–1818	Succeeded by John Edwards
Preceded by John Edwards	Member of Parliament for Glamorganshire; 1820–1830	Succeeded by Christopher Talbot
