= Banda Neira =

Island in Indonesia

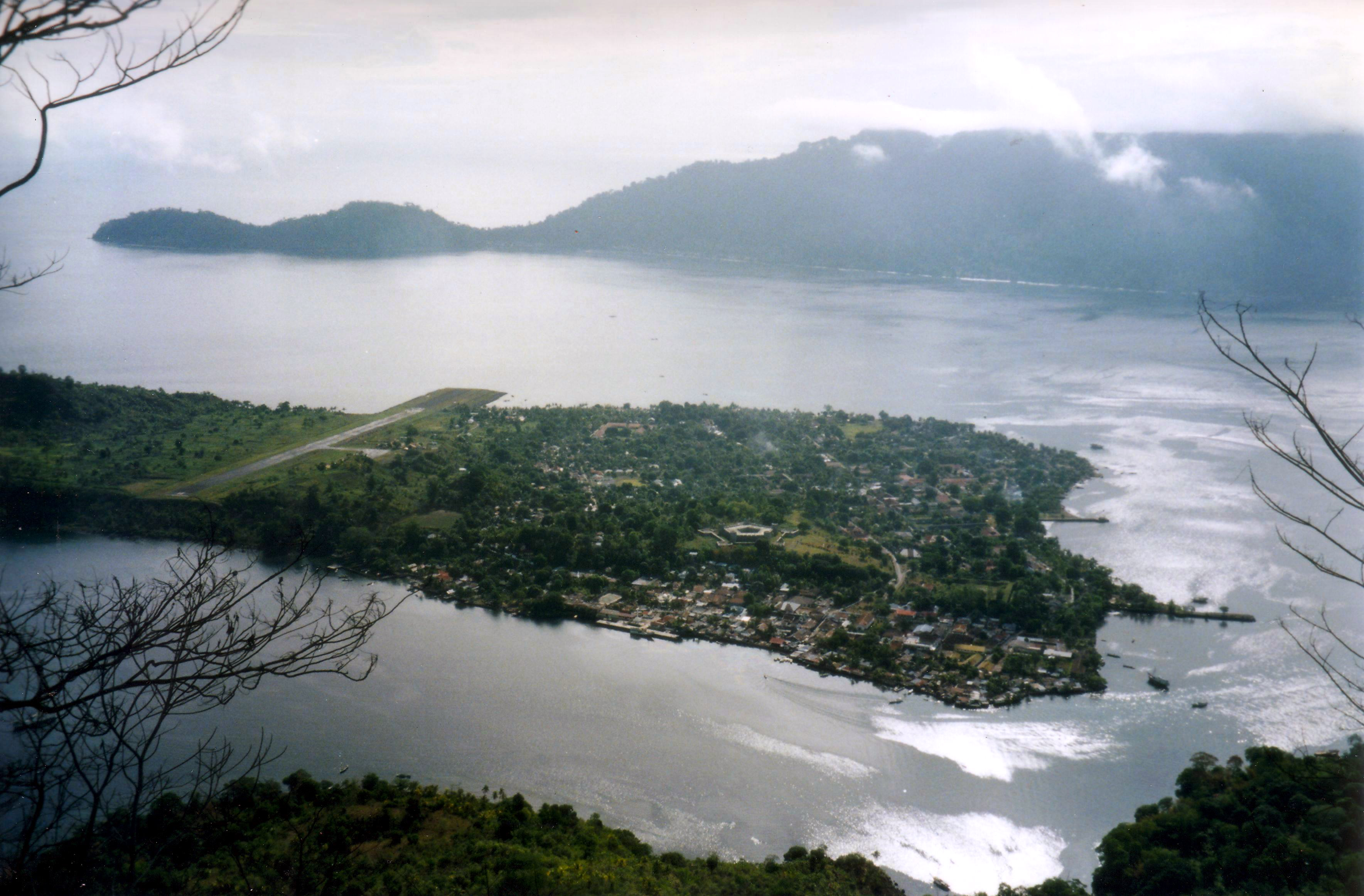
- Banda Neira in the late 1990s viewed from Gunung Api

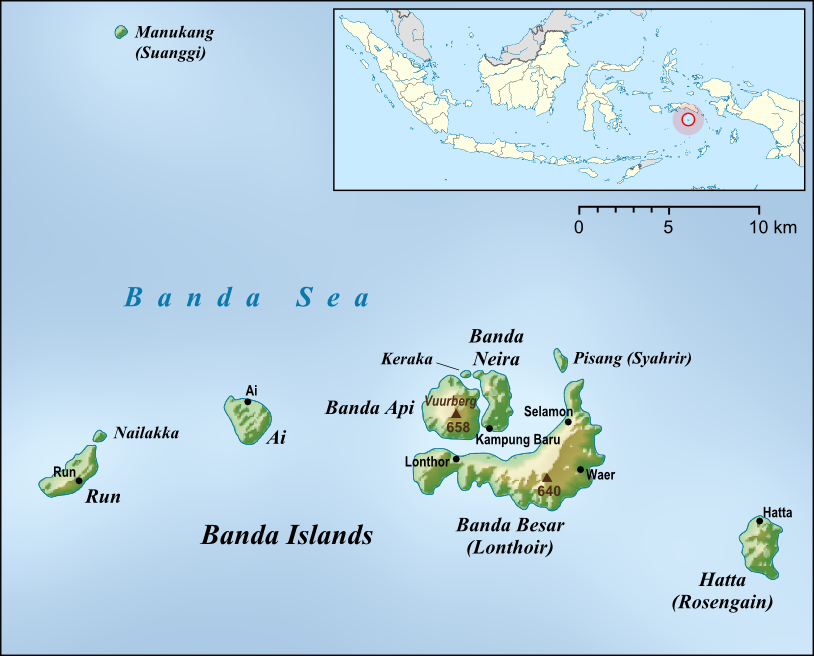
- Map of Banda Islands

- Location in Indonesia

Geography
- Location: Banda Sea
- Coordinates: 4°31′3″S 129°54′9″E
- Archipelago: Banda Islands
- Area: 3 km^{2} (1.2 sq mi)
- Length: 3.3 km (2.05 mi)
- Width: 1.3 km (0.81 mi)
- Highest elevation: 250 m (820 ft)
- Highest point: Papenberg

Administration
- Indonesia

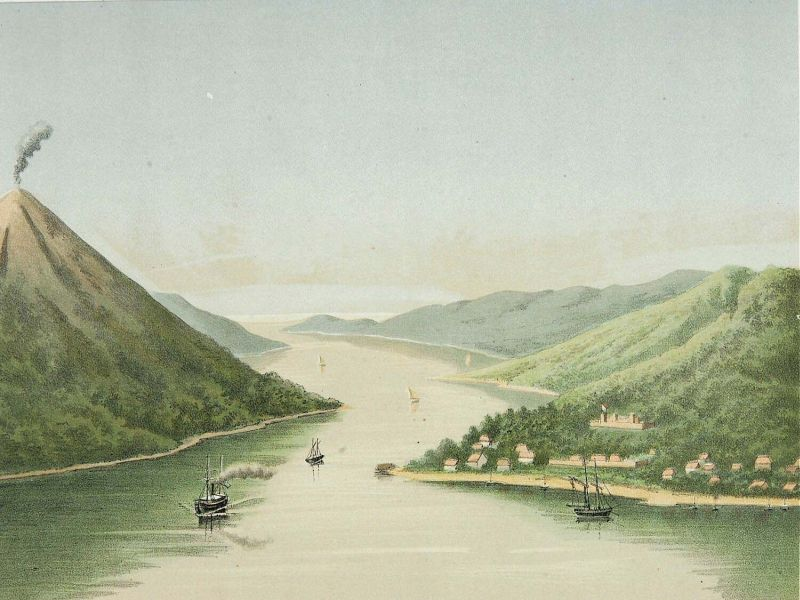
View of Bandanaira (lithograph based on a painting by Josias Cornelis Rappard, 1883–1889)

Banda Neira (or Pulau Neira) is an island in the Banda Islands, Indonesia. It is administered as part of the administrative Banda Islands District (Kecamatan Kepulauan Banda) within the Central Maluku Regency in the province of Maluku. On its south end is the main town of the same name, which is the largest town in the archipelago with around 7,000 inhabitants.

== Geography ==
The island has a length of about 3.3 kilometres (2.1 mi) and a width of 1.3 kilometres (0.81 mi), with Mount Papenberg as the highest elevation at 250 metres (820 ft). It is located approximately 160 kilometres (99 mi) south of the island of Seram. The island is at the center of the Banda Islands group, with the neighbouring island of Banda Api (essentially the cone of the volcanic Gunung Api) situated around 100 metres west, and Banda Besar (also called Lonthoir, formerly Lontar) being around 1.5 km to the south and east. Banda Api and Banda Neira form the centre and Lonthoir forms most of the surviving rim of a submerged caldera with a diameter of around seven kilometers.

== History ==
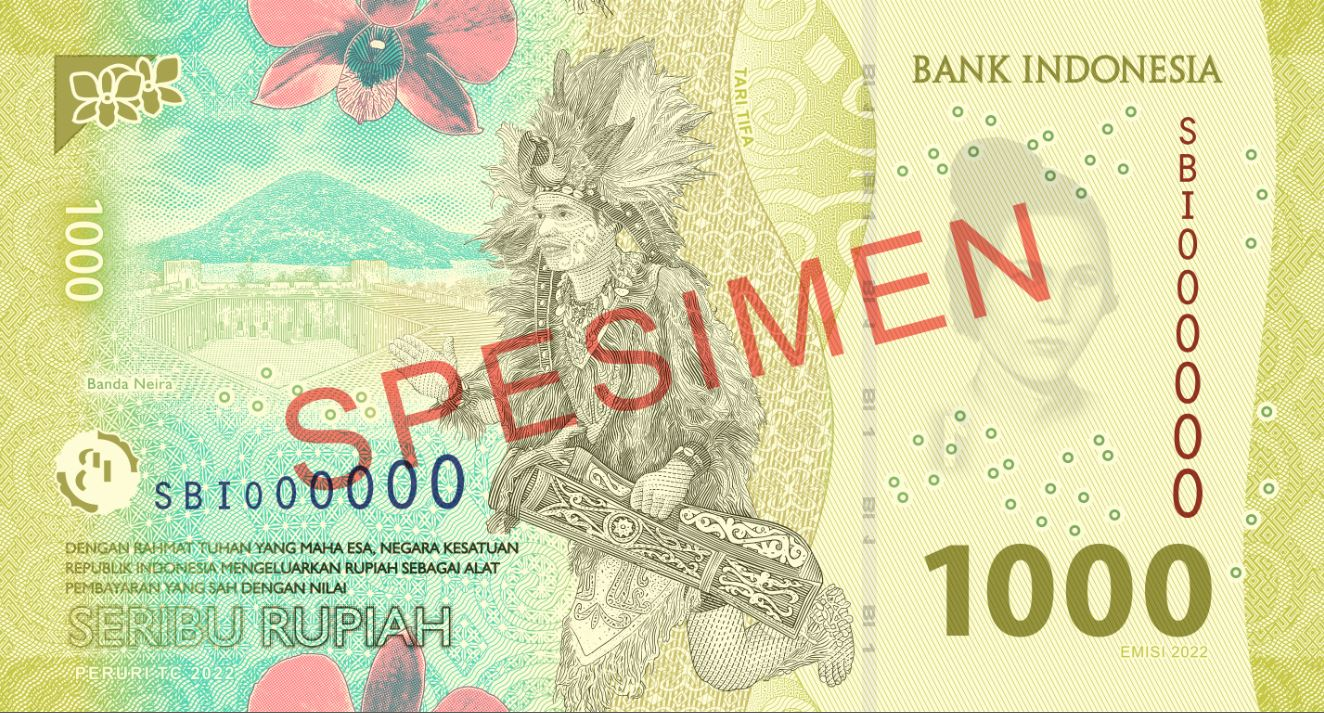
Banda Neira featured on the reverse of the 1,000 rupiah banknote

Nutmeg is grown on the island and trade brought the inhabitants great wealth in the premodern period. Until the early 17th century, the Banda Islands were ruled by local magnates called the Orang Kaya. The Portuguese first sailed to the Banda Islands in 1512, a year after Afonso de Albuquerque had conquered Malacca, which at the time was the hub of Asian trade. Only in 1529 did the Portuguese return to the islands, when Captain Garcia attempted to build a fort on Banda Neira. The local Bandanese turned against Garcia and his crew, forcing him to abandon his plans.

The Portuguese were replaced by the Dutch, who established friendly relations and a trading outpost in 1599, but in 1609 the Orang Kaya on Banda Neira rebelled against Dutch attempts to coerce a monopoly on the spice trade, killing 30 Netherlanders. This resulted in a brutal campaign against the people of the Banda Islands by the Dutch. Fort Belgica was built in 1611 to intimidate the Orang Kaya and the English, who had established a fortress on the island of Run.

The Dutch conquest of the Banda Islands cumulated with the Banda Massacre of 1621, in which Jan Pieterszoon Coen, invaded the islands and subsequently began a campaign to commit genocide against the local inhabitants.

To keep the archipelago productive, the VOC repopulated the islands (including Banda Neira), mostly with slaves taken from the rest of modern-day Indonesia, India, and the coast of China, working under the command of Dutch planters (perkeniers). The original natives were also enslaved and were ordered to teach the newcomers about nutmeg and mace agriculture. The treatment of the slaves was severe—the native Bandanese population dropped to one hundred by 1681, and 200 slaves were imported annually to keep the slave population steady at 4,000. In these modern times, not many parkeniers survived though the plantation owned by Pongky Van de Broeke, descendant of Paulus van den Broeke, brother of Pieter van den Broecke, still exists and regularly serves tourists to the island.

During the Dutch period, pro-independence activists Tjipto Mangoenkoesoemo, Sutan Sjahrir, and Mohammad Hatta all spent time in internal exile on Banda Neira. The Dutch continued to rule the island until 1949, although the economic importance of nutmeg and mace declined greatly due to the loss of the Dutch monopoly after the British successfully planted nutmeg trees in other parts of the world (especially Penang and the Caribbean) following the Invasion of the Spice Islands in the Napoleonic Wars in 1810. After Indonesian independence, the island has been administered as part of the Indonesian province of Maluku.

Banda Api erupted on May 10, 1988, from a N-SSW-trending fissure that cut across the island, with both explosive activity and lava effusion occurring. The height of the eruption pillar was estimated at 3 to 5 kilometers on May 9; satellite measurements indicate an altitude of over 16 kilometers. To the south, north, and northwest of the summit, three craters formed, from which lava flows emerged that all reached the sea. The 1,800 islanders of Banda Api, as well as 5,000 of the then 6,000 or so residents of the island of Banda Neira were evacuated to Ambon, some 200 kilometers away. Three people died as a result of the volcanic eruptions and most of the inhabitants of Banda Api chose to relocate to Banda Neira.

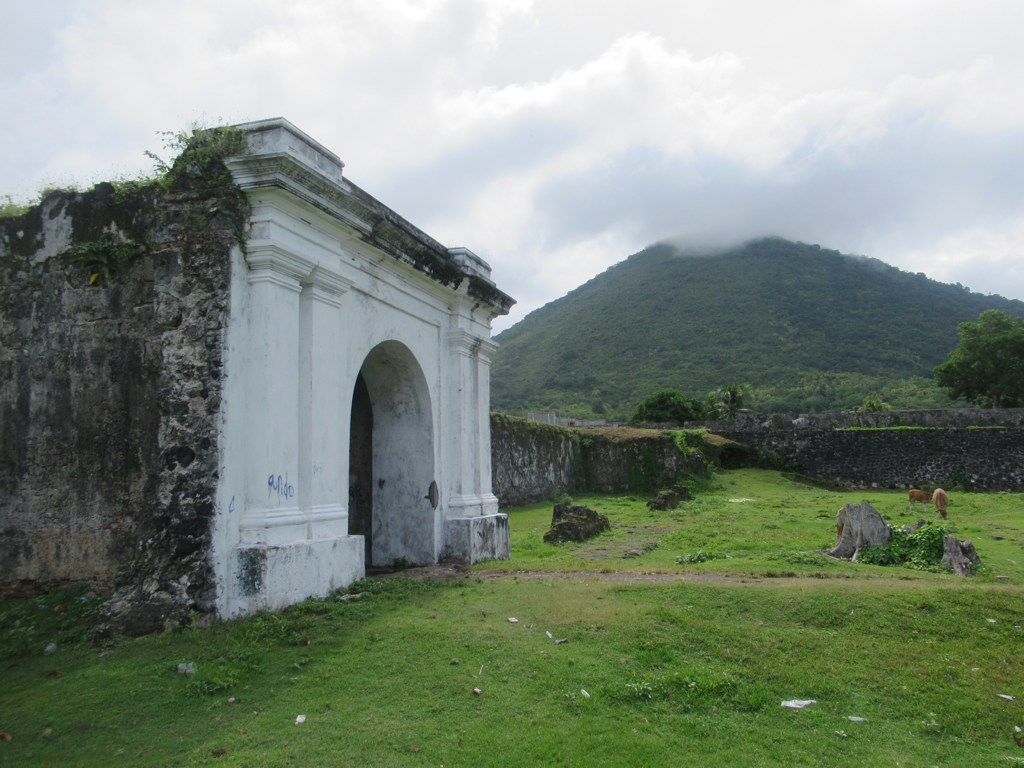
Fort Nassau

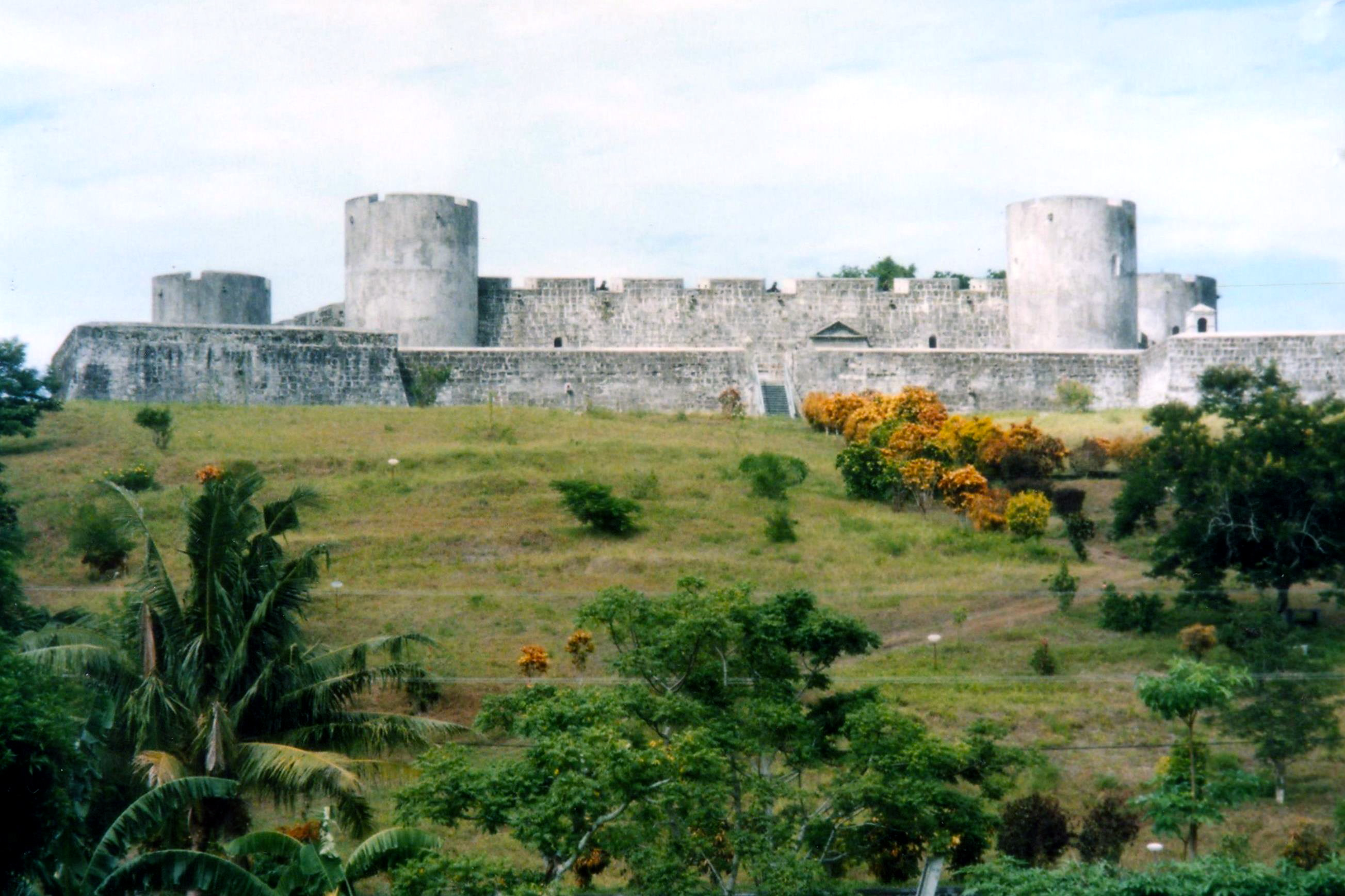
Fort Belgica

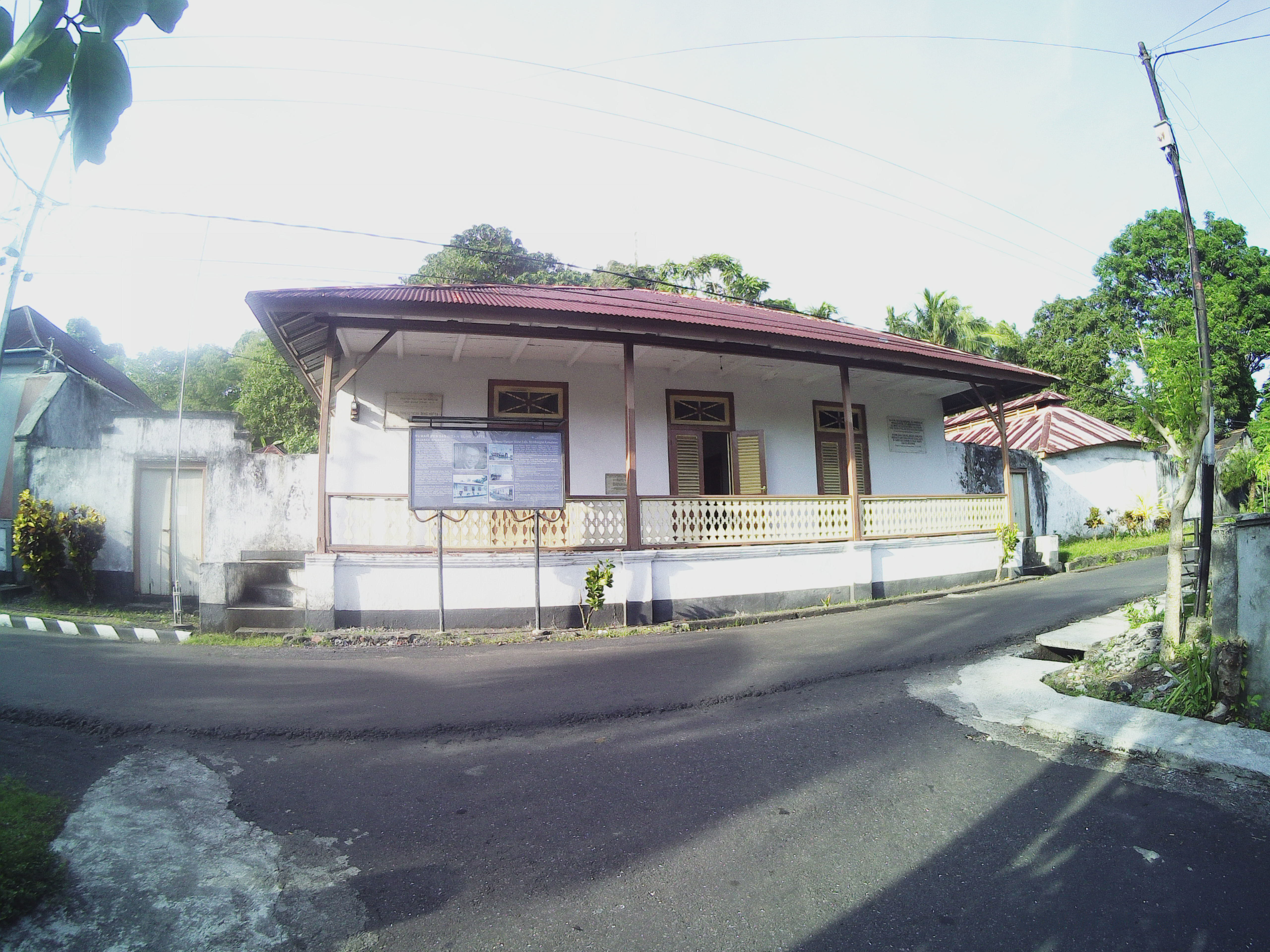
Muhammad Hatta home in exile

== See also ==
- Dutch conquest of the Banda Islands (1621)
