= Otanaha Fortress =

Coordinates: 0°32′56″N 123°0′30″E

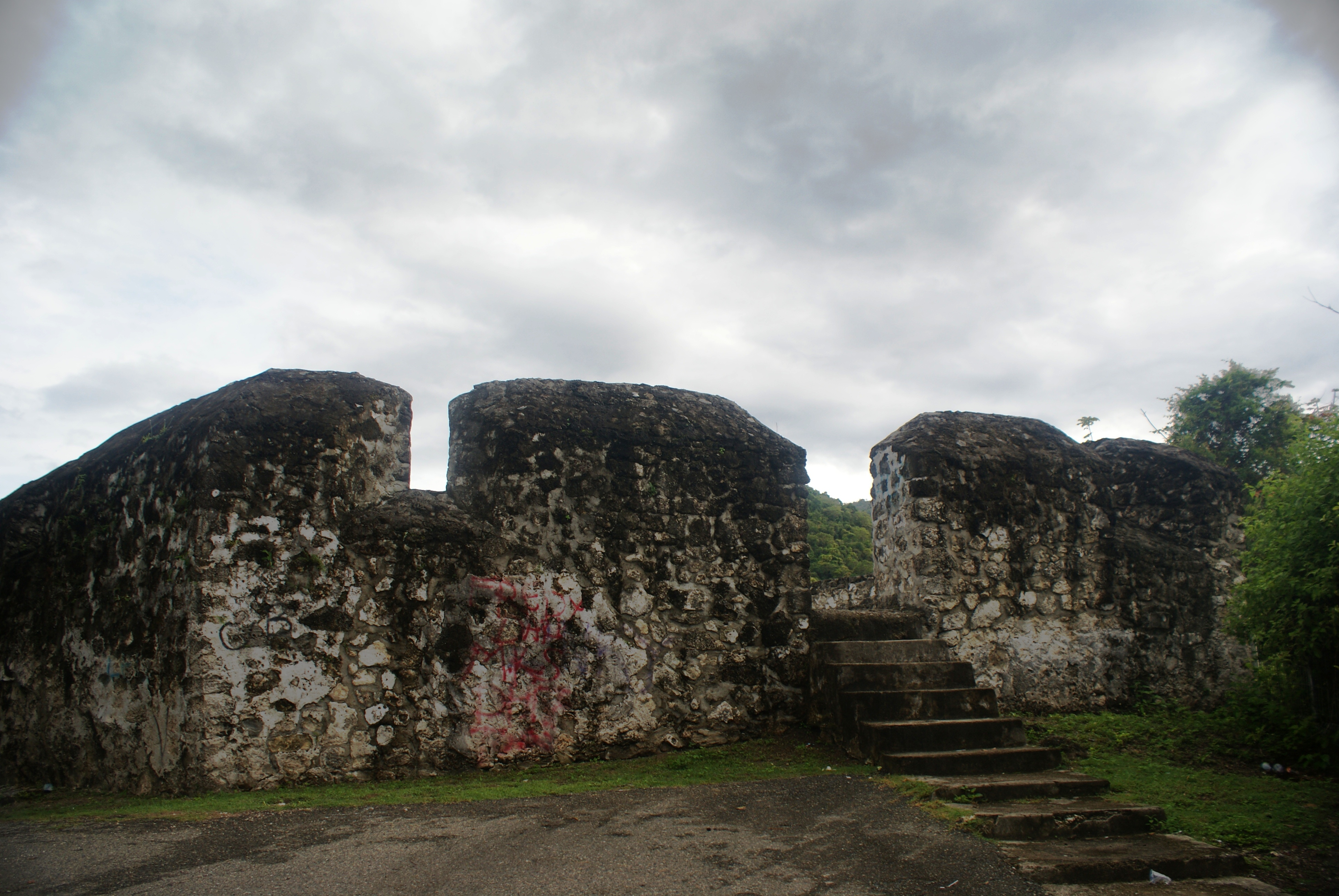
The front side of Otanaha Fortress

Otanaha Fortress is a tourism site in Gorontalo province on Sulawesi Island, Indonesia. It was built in 1522 by King Ilato of the Gorontalo Kingdom and Portuguese sailors to strengthen the area's security and defense. Located on Dembe Hill, this fort was made from mixture of sand, calcium, and the eggs of Maleo birds. To reach the top of this fort, there are 348 steps separated into four stopovers: 52 steps from the base to the first stopover, 83 steps from the first to the second stopover, 53 from second to third, and 89 steps from the third to the fourth stopover. From the last stopover, there are another 71 steps to reach the fort. From the top of this fortress, there are panoramic views of Limboto Lake and parts of the Gorontalo region.

== History ==
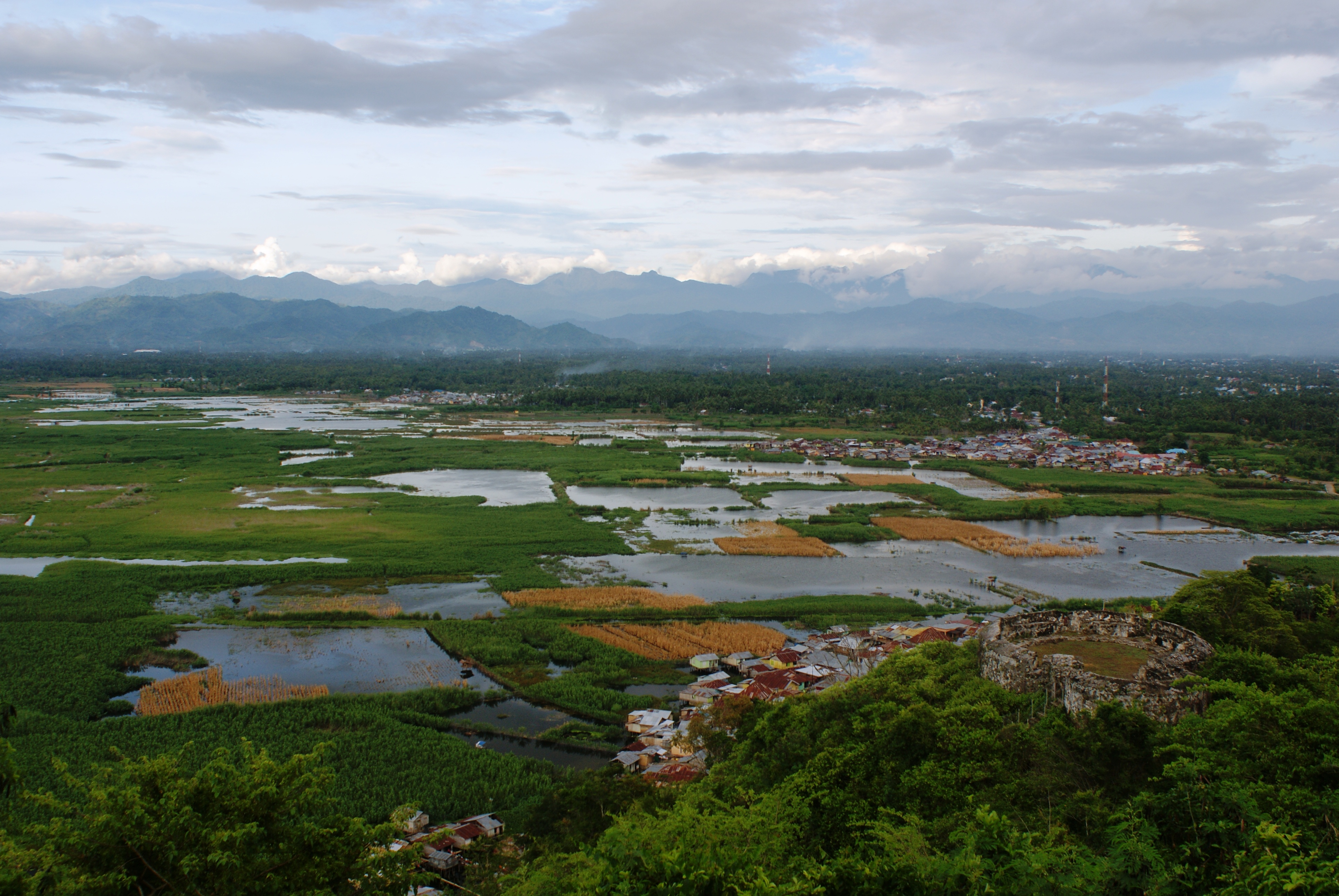
The panoramic view of Limboto Lake and Otahiya fortress from the top of Otanaha Fortress

According to history, in the 16th century, the Portuguese sailors stopped in Kota Barat, Gorontalo because of bad weather, pirate threats, and lack of provisions. They offered the king of Gorontalo to build three fortress atop Dembe Hill to protect the area. The Ilato King had two daughters name Ndoba and Tiliaya, and one son called Naha. However, after the construction of those fortress, the Gorontalo princesses found out that Portuguese misused the kingdom's kindness as instrument to drive away their pirate enemies. Then the Gorontalo people turned back to dislodge the Portuguese out of their kingdom.

When Naha succeeded his father and became the King of Gorontalo, there were at war from Hemuto, the leader of transmigrant community in the north region of Gorontalo. In 1585, he accidentally found Otanaha fortress and used it as a shelter for his wife, Ohihiya, and their two son Paha (Pahu) and Limonu. During the war, Naha and Paha were killed by Hemuto. Then, Limonu swore revenge and killed Hemuto.

The name of three fortress used during the war was given based on Naha family. The first fort name Otanaha from Ota means fort and Naha was the person who found the fort. The second fortress was named Otahiya from word Hiya, after Naha's wife Ohihiya. The third fort is named Uwole which means Pahu's fortress, after Naha's son.
