= Jayakarta War =

17th-century conflicts in Indonesia

- Part of the prelude to the Anglo–Dutch wars
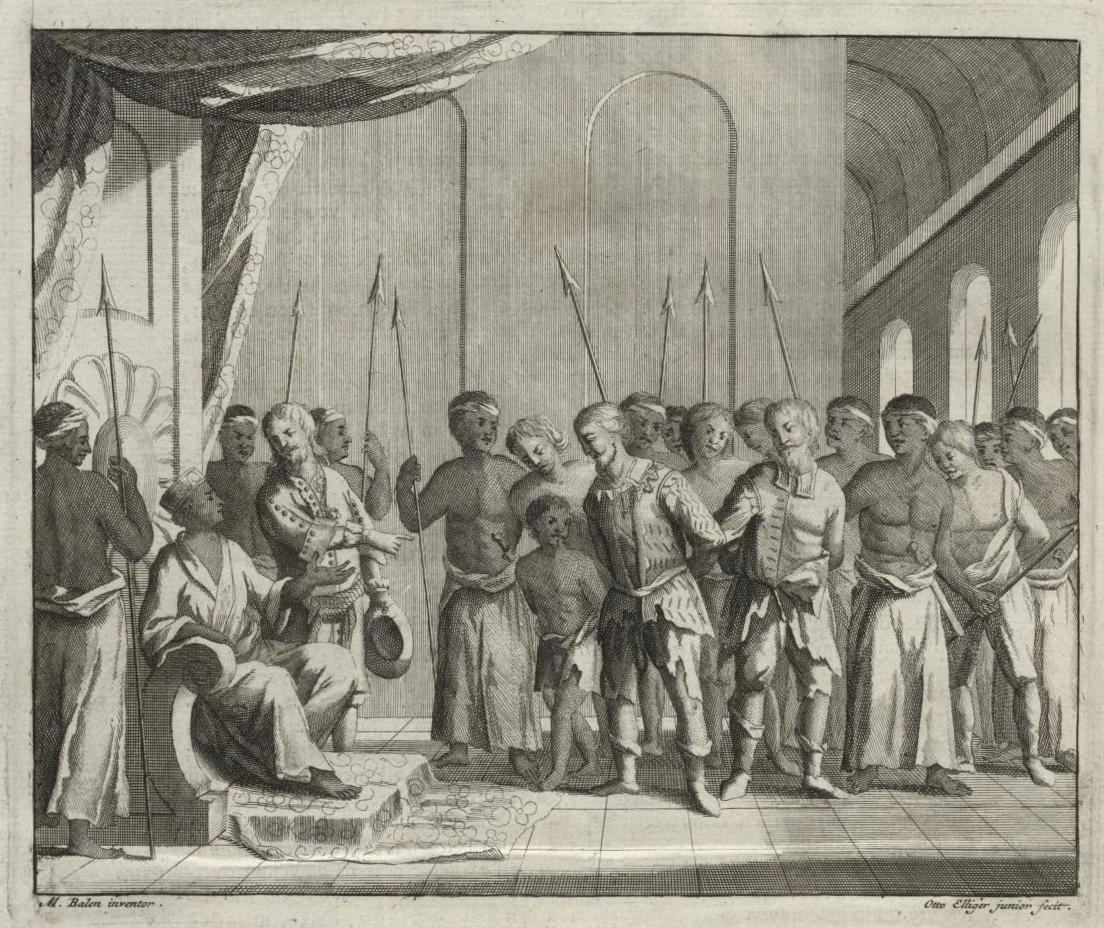
- Pieter van den Broecke taken captive (1724 print)
Date	20 December 1618 – March 1619
Location	Jayakarta (present-day Jakarta)
Result	Anglo–Jayakartan victory

Belligerents
(Banten Sultanate) Regency of Jayakarta; East India Company; English Bantam; Supported by: Banten Sultanate (Note: Until late January 1619, because there was a difference of opinion between Wijayakrama and Arya Ranamanggala)	Dutch East India Company Banten Sultanate (Note: After the siege of Mauritius Huis (late January 1619))

Commanders and leaders
(Banten Sultanate) Wijayakrama (POW); Thomas Dale; Martin Pring; John Jourdain; Nicholas Ufftele (Banten Sultanate) Arya Ranamanggala (Note: From 26 December 1618 until late January 1619.)	Jan Pieterszoon Coen; Pieter de Carpentier; Pieter van den Broecke (POW) (Banten Sultanate) Arya Ranamanggala (Banten Sultanate) Upapatih (Banten Sultanate) Jayawikarta

Strength
(Banten Sultanate) 2,000–3,000; Unknown	2,000–5,000 (Banten Sultanate) 4,000

Casualties and losses
Light	Roughly about hundreds of troops were killed Several unknown ships destroyed

The Jayakarta War (Indonesian: Perang Jayakarta; Dutch: Jayakarta-oorlog) was a military conflict in Jayakarta, Indonesia, from 1618 to 1619 fought by an alliance of the British East India Company (EIC) and Jayakartan forces against the Dutch East India Company (VOC).

The Anglo-Jayakartan forces inflicted significant losses on the Dutch during the war, and many Dutch lodges and forts were captured with the help of the Bantenese. Suppression of the VOC following the war caused the Dutch to retreat from Banten, eventually leading to incidents on the island of Run. The VOC then began to prepare their second attempt at conquering Jayakarta in May 1619.

== Background ==
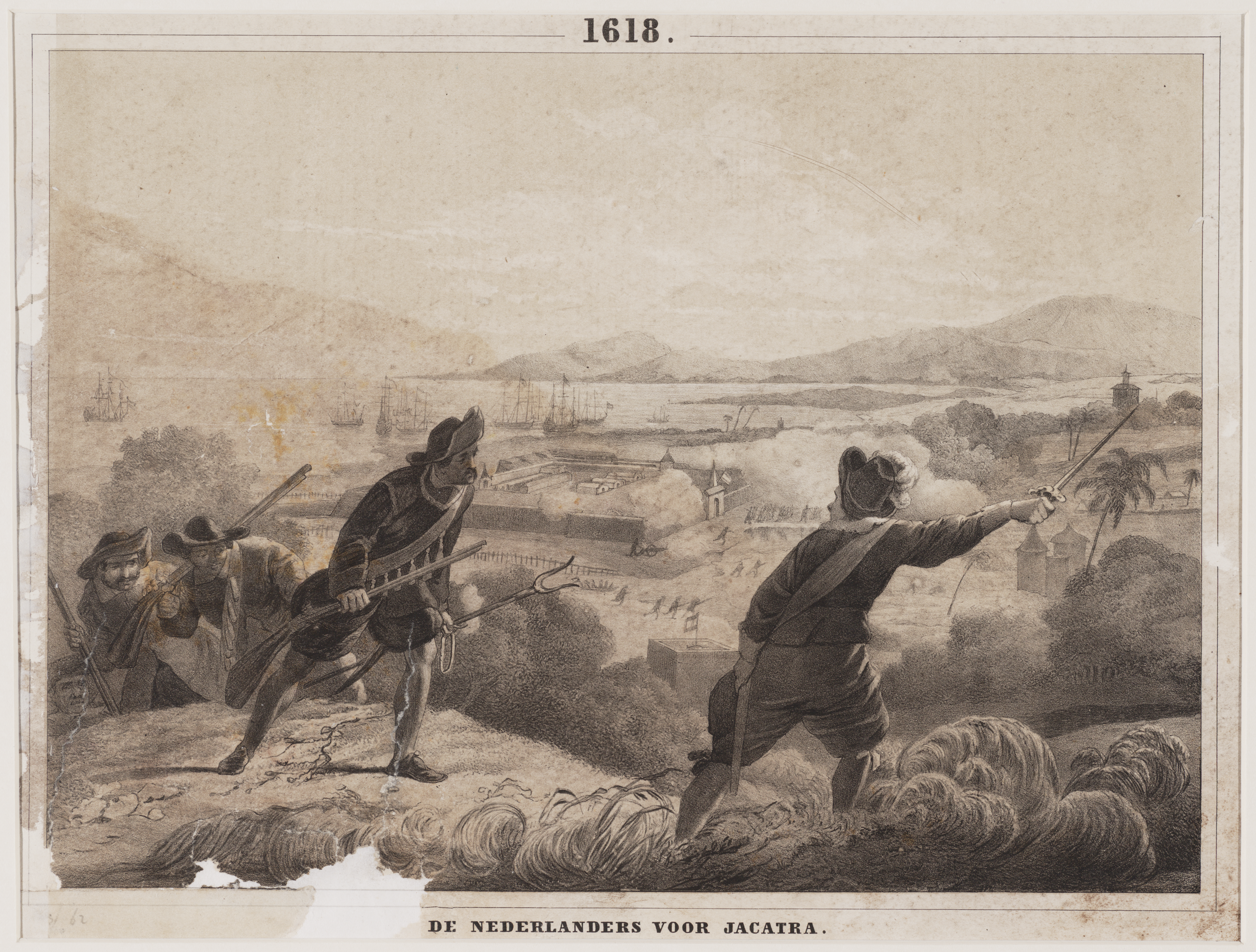
Dutch in Jayakarta, 1618

In 1618, the governor-general of the VOC, Jan Pieterszoon Coen, sent a protest message to Thomas Dale of the EIC in Jayakarta, complaining that English ships had hijacked and captured the VOC ship Zwarte Leeuw in Patani, Siam. Coen suggested that the English were starting to harm Anglo-Dutch relations in the East Indies, but the English countered that the Dutch had started the conflict by trying to expel the English from Molucca.

The actual Dutch aim was to expel the English from their possessions in the East Indies and to remove their local allies. Consequently, Coen concluded that the English justifications did not reflect the true reasons for seizing Dutch ships in Siam and declared war against the EIC in the East Indies. He also planned to assassinate Nicholas Ufftels in order to intimidate the English.

== Course of the war ==
Coen declared war in the East Indies two days after the VOC fleets in Molucca were plundered by EIC ships. The EIC received news that an English ambassador in Jambi, Richard Wetsby, had been killed as the result of a party invitation from the VOC, and that the EIC ship The Hound had been burned. Military action commenced, and on 20 December 1618 the VOC and EIC fleets had a naval engagement off the Jayakarta coast.

On 26 December 1618, the Banten Sultanate sent between 2,000 and 3,000 troops to Jayakarta on Arya Ranamanggala's orders, the main objective being to expel the VOC from Jayakarta. Ranamanggala ruled that the VOC could not trade and open lodges in Jayakarta, but the arrival of his Bantenese forces unsettled Wijayakrama, the ruler of Jayakarta. Wijayakrama demanded that if the Dutch were to leave Jayakarta, then the English must also leave. According to the EIC, this demand signaled Wijayakrama's desire to sever his relations with Banten and pressed the English to take action about the situation in Jayakarta. Meanwhile, five VOC ships left Jayakarta.

On 31 December 1618, Coen launched another naval action off the Jayakarta coast, but his fleets were trapped by the Anglo-Bantenese fleets and were unable to attack. As a result, Coen retreated to Molucca to assemble his forces.

=== Assault on Fort of Mauritius Huis ===
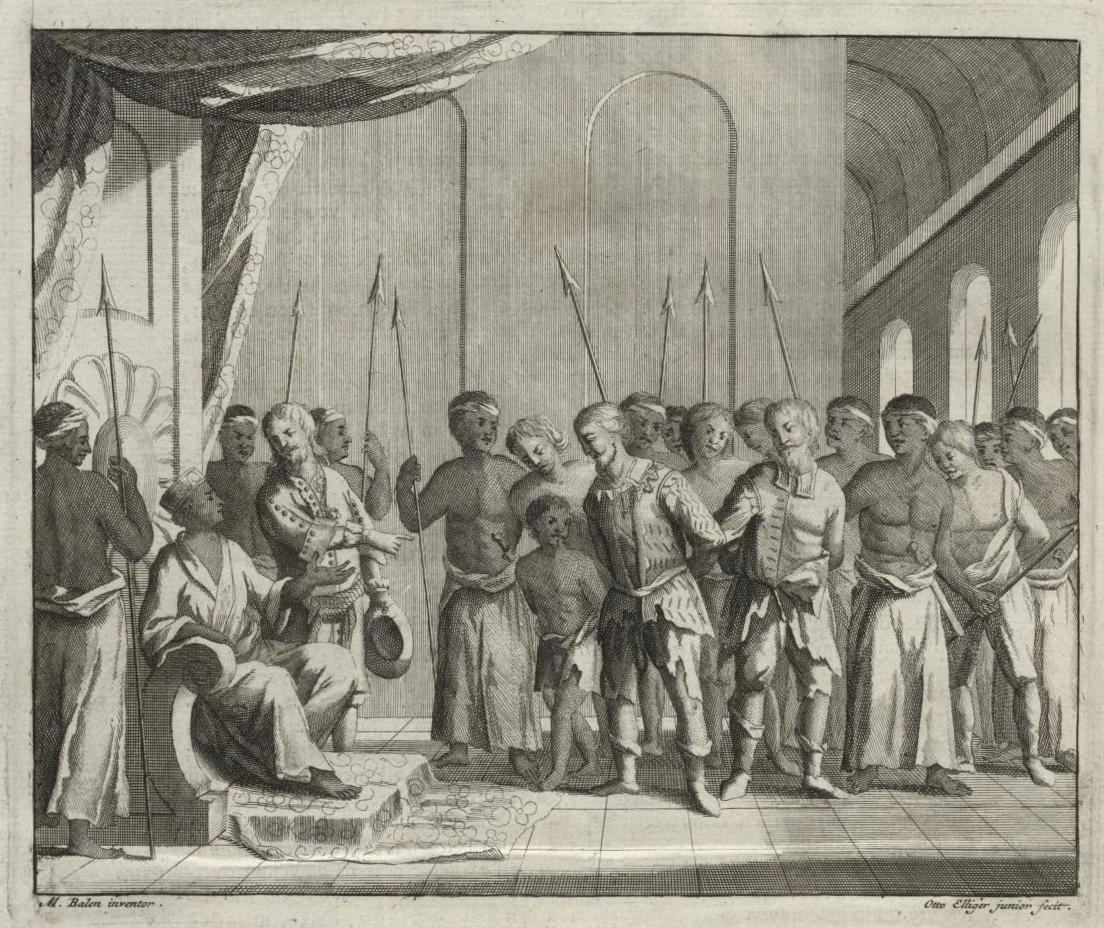
The Sultan of Mataram and the Dutch leader Pieter van den Broecke taken captive by the Javanese forces, 1619 (Note: By François Valentijn)

The Anglo-Jayakarta forces attacked the VOC Fort of Mauritius Huis on the Jayakarta coast between the 10th and 14th of January 1619, causing the Dutch to retreat to Jepara and Ambon. The Dutch sent a message to the EIC requesting fair treatment for the VOC officials and their families still trapped in the fort, claiming that they were living in terrible conditions and that the EIC had given no assurance of their safety. The EIC agreed to the Dutch request and put forward 200,000 lire for the safety of Dutch personnel over a two-year period. Nevertheless, the VOC responded by attacking EIC fleets in Ambon.

On 22 January 1619, Jayakarta forces led by Wijayakrama moved to kidnap the VOC leaders in Jayakarta, successfully apprehending Pieter van den Broecke.

On 29 January 1619 – after the Anglo-Jayakarta forces had stormed the VOC forts off the Jayakarta coast – the Bantenese forces blockaded the VOC forts, with the English only supplying them with weapons. This resulted in the VOC officials at the fort being forced to surrender to the Anglo-Jayakartan forces after four days.

Meanwhile, the Cirebon Sultanate established relations with the EIC and opened their ports to them, choosing Henry Boshvile as the leader of their trade posts in Jepara.

=== Arrest of Wijayakrama ===
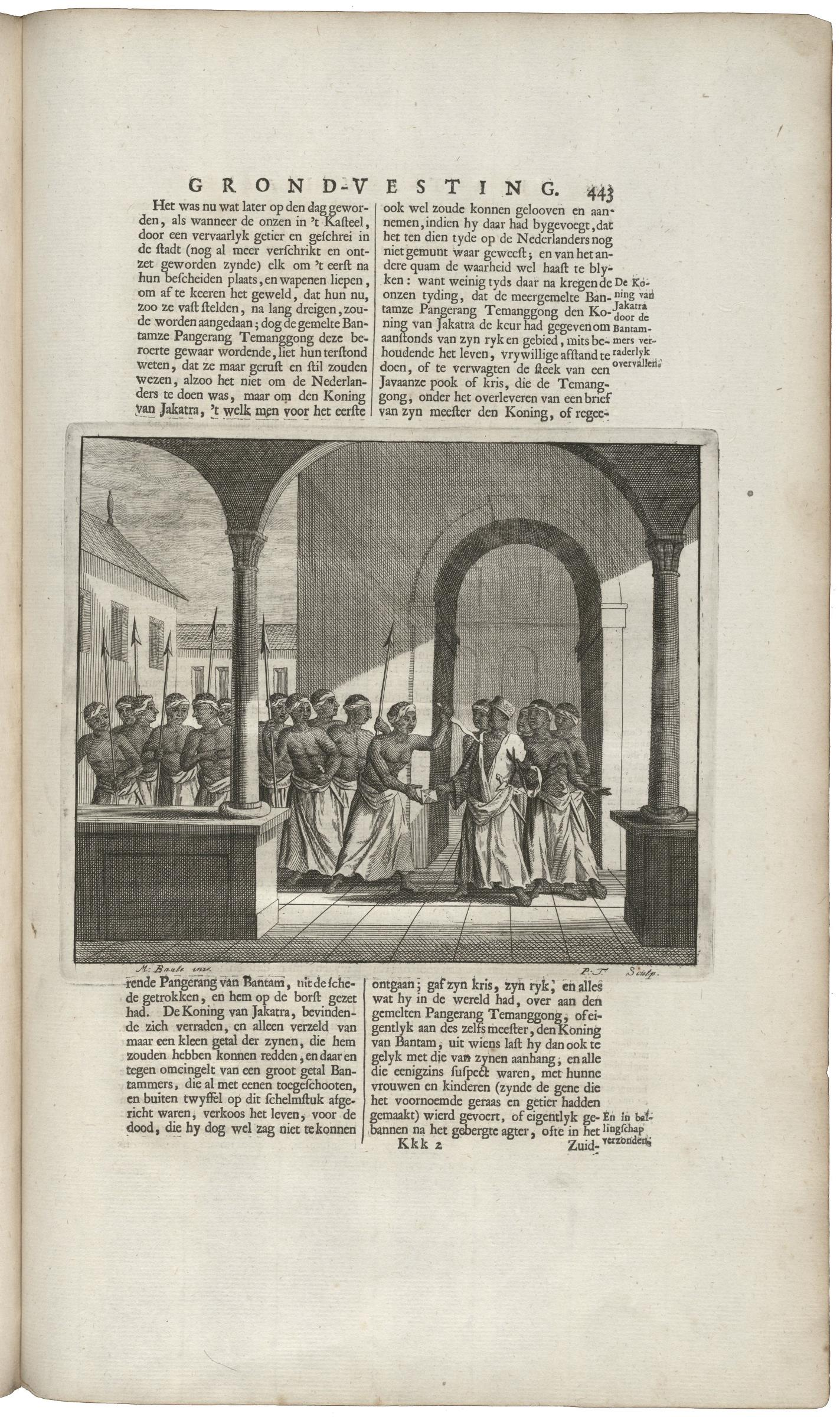
The sultan of Mataram (Wijayakrama) attacked by Bantam fighters, 1724 print.

Arya Ranamanggala took offence at Wijayakrama's decisions to declare war against the Dutch and make an agreement with the English about the Dutch fort. Ranamanggala demanded that the English must leave Jayakarta or he would destroy their trading office in Banten. On 19 February 1619, during the negotiations, Ranamanggala ordered his commander Pangeran Upapatih to attack the English troops with 4,000 men. Following the attack, several English troops left Jayakarta. Along with fifty of his guards, Wijayakrama was arrested, dismissed from his position, and exiled to Tanara. Wijayakrama's son Jayawikarta rose to lead the Jayakartan government, but Ranamanggala remained his superior, causing Jayakarta to fall completely under the control of Arya Ranamanggala.

=== Capture of lodges and factories ===
On 1 March 1619, the Anglo-Jayakarta forces attacked the VOC lodges off the Jayakarta coast with both naval and ground units. With the help of EIC fleets, the Jayakarta forces captured the VOC lodges and factories, seizing much of the VOC spices and weaponry and enabling the English to free their captured men.

== Aftermath ==
Coen and his fleet bombarded the English fleet at the island of Run, the EIC's main base, with many of the forts being partially destroyed. The VOC fleet also attacked EIC spice farms within cannon range, but then delayed their campaign in the Banda Islands in order to sail for Jayakarta and launch a counter-attack there.

At Jayakarta, Coen decided to attack the Bantenese forces off the coast and recapture the fort that was then under Bantenese occupation. He launched a series of brutal naval actions on Jayakarta, destroying the port of Jepara and hijacking many Chinese ships who wanted to trade with Jayakarta.
