= 1652 =

1652 in various calendars
- Gregorian calendar: 1652; MDCLII
- Ab urbe condita: 2405
- Armenian calendar: 1101; ԹՎ ՌՃԱ
- Assyrian calendar: 6402
- Balinese saka calendar: 1573–1574
- Bengali calendar: 1058–1059
- Berber calendar: 2602
- English Regnal year: 3 Cha. 2 – 4 Cha. 2 (Interregnum)
- Buddhist calendar: 2196
- Burmese calendar: 1014
- Byzantine calendar: 7160–7161
- Chinese calendar: 辛卯年 (Metal Rabbit); 4349 or 4142 — to — 壬辰年 (Water Dragon); 4350 or 4143
- Coptic calendar: 1368–1369
- Discordian calendar: 2818
- Ethiopian calendar: 1644–1645
- Hebrew calendar: 5412–5413
- Hindu calendars
- Vikram Samvat: 1708–1709
- Shaka Samvat: 1573–1574
- Kali Yuga: 4752–4753
- Holocene calendar: 11652
- Igbo calendar: 652–653
- Iranian calendar: 1030–1031
- Islamic calendar: 1062–1063
- Japanese calendar: Keian 5 / Jōō 1 (承応元年)
- Javanese calendar: 1573–1574
- Julian calendar: Gregorian minus 10 days
- Korean calendar: 3985
- Minguo calendar: 260 before ROC 民前260年
- Nanakshahi calendar: 184
- Thai solar calendar: 2194–2195
- Tibetan calendar: ལྕགས་མོ་ཡོས་ལོ་ (female Iron-Hare); 1778 or 1397 or 625 — to — ཆུ་ཕོ་འབྲུག་ལོ་ (male Water-Dragon); 1779 or 1398 or 626

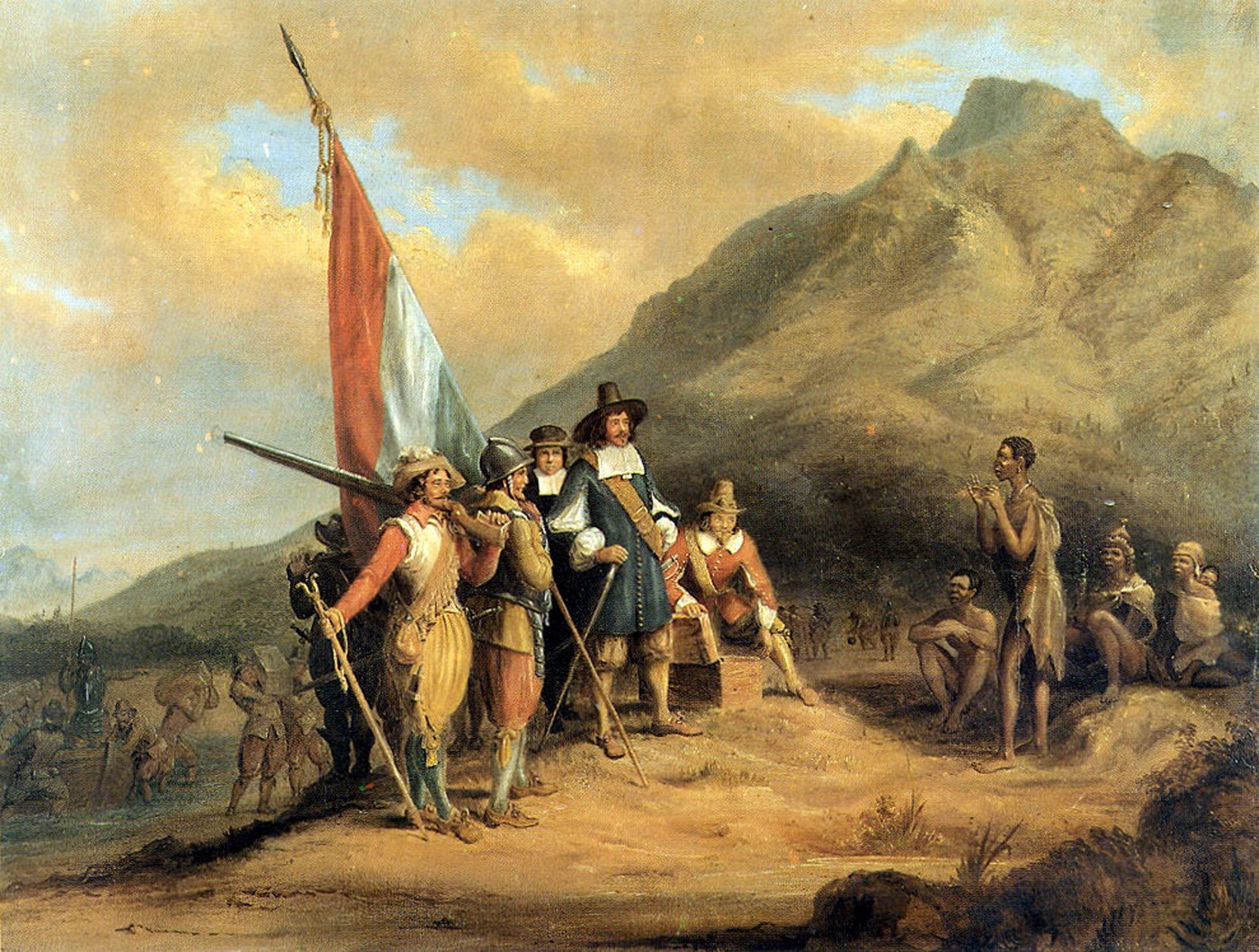
April 6: Jan van Riebeeck establishes Cape Town.

1652 (MDCLII) was a leap year starting on Monday of the Gregorian calendar and a leap year starting on Thursday of the Julian calendar, the 1652nd year of the Common Era (CE) and Anno Domini (AD) designations, the 652nd year of the 2nd millennium, the 52nd year of the 17th century, and the 3rd year of the 1650s decade. As of the start of 1652, the Gregorian calendar was 10 days ahead of the Julian calendar, which remained in localized use until 1923.

== Events ==
=== January–March ===
- January 8 – Michiel de Ruyter marries the widow Anna van Gelder and plans retirement, but months later becomes a vice-commodore in the First Anglo-Dutch War.
- February 4 – At Edinburgh, the parliamentary commissioners of the Commonwealth of England proclaim the Tender of Union to be in force in Scotland, annexing the Scottish nation with the concession that Scotland would have 30 representatives in the parliament of the English Commonwealth.
- February 12 – Oliver Cromwell, England's Lord Protector, announces that his Council of Scotland will regulate church affairs as part of the Terms of Incorporation of Scotland into England, and eliminates Presbyterianism as Scotland's state religion.
- March 29 (April 8 New Style) – Total solar eclipse of April 8, 1652 ("Black Monday").

=== April–June ===
- April 6 – Dutch sailor Jan van Riebeeck establishes a resupply camp for the Dutch East India Company at the Cape of Good Hope in modern-day South Africa, thus founding Cape Town.
- May 18 – Rhode Island passes the first law in North America making slavery illegal.
- May 19 (May 29, New Style) – First Anglo-Dutch War: Battle of Dover – The opening battle is fought off Dover between Lt.-Admiral Maarten Tromp's 42 Dutch ships and 21 English ships divided into two squadrons, one commanded by Robert Blake and the other by Nehemiah Bourne; the result is inconclusive.
- June 13 – George Fox preaches to a large crowd on Firbank Fell in England, leading to the establishment of the Religious Society of Friends (Quakers).

=== July–September ===
- July 2 – The Battle of the Faubourg St Antoine is fought east of Paris between French Parliamentarians (led by Louis, Grand Condé) against the army of King Louis XIV, commanded by the Viscount of Turenne, with neither side prevailing.
- July 4 – A mob kills 150 people, including judges, in the massacre at the Hôtel de Ville, Paris.
- July 5 – The 1652 Articles of Peace and Friendship are signed between the Province of Maryland and the Conestoga Indians, ceding most of the land around the Chesapeake Bay to the English colonists.
- July 10 – The First Anglo-Dutch War begins formally as the English Commonwealth declares war against the Dutch Republic.
- July 17 – The "Great Fire of Glasgow" destroys one-third of the Scottish city.
- August 26 – First Anglo-Dutch War: Battle of Plymouth – A fleet from the Commonwealth of England attacks an outward-bound convoy of the Dutch Republic, escorted by 23 men-of-war and six fire ships, commanded by Vice-Commodore Michiel de Ruyter; the Dutch escape.
- September 11 – The Guo Huaiyi Rebellion, a peasant revolt on the island of Taiwan against colonial rule in Dutch Formosa, is suppressed after four days.

=== October–December ===
- October 2 – The Great Fire of Oulu destroys almost all of the houses of the town’s bourgeoisie, the provision warehouses and the drawbridge of Oulu Castle, in the town of Oulu, Finland.
- October 8 – First Anglo-Dutch War: Battle of the Kentish Knock – In a battle fought near the shoal called the Kentish Knock in the North Sea, about 30 km (19 mi) from the mouth of the River Thames, the Dutch are forced to withdraw.
- November 30 – The Netherlands takes control of the English Channel after the Battle of Dungeness ends in a Dutch victory over the English Royal Navy.
- December 10 – First Anglo-Dutch War: Defeat at the Battle of Dungeness causes the Commonwealth of England to reform its navy.

=== Date unknown ===
The first coins of the Massachusetts pound are made for circulation. Prior currency had consisted of wampum.

== Births ==
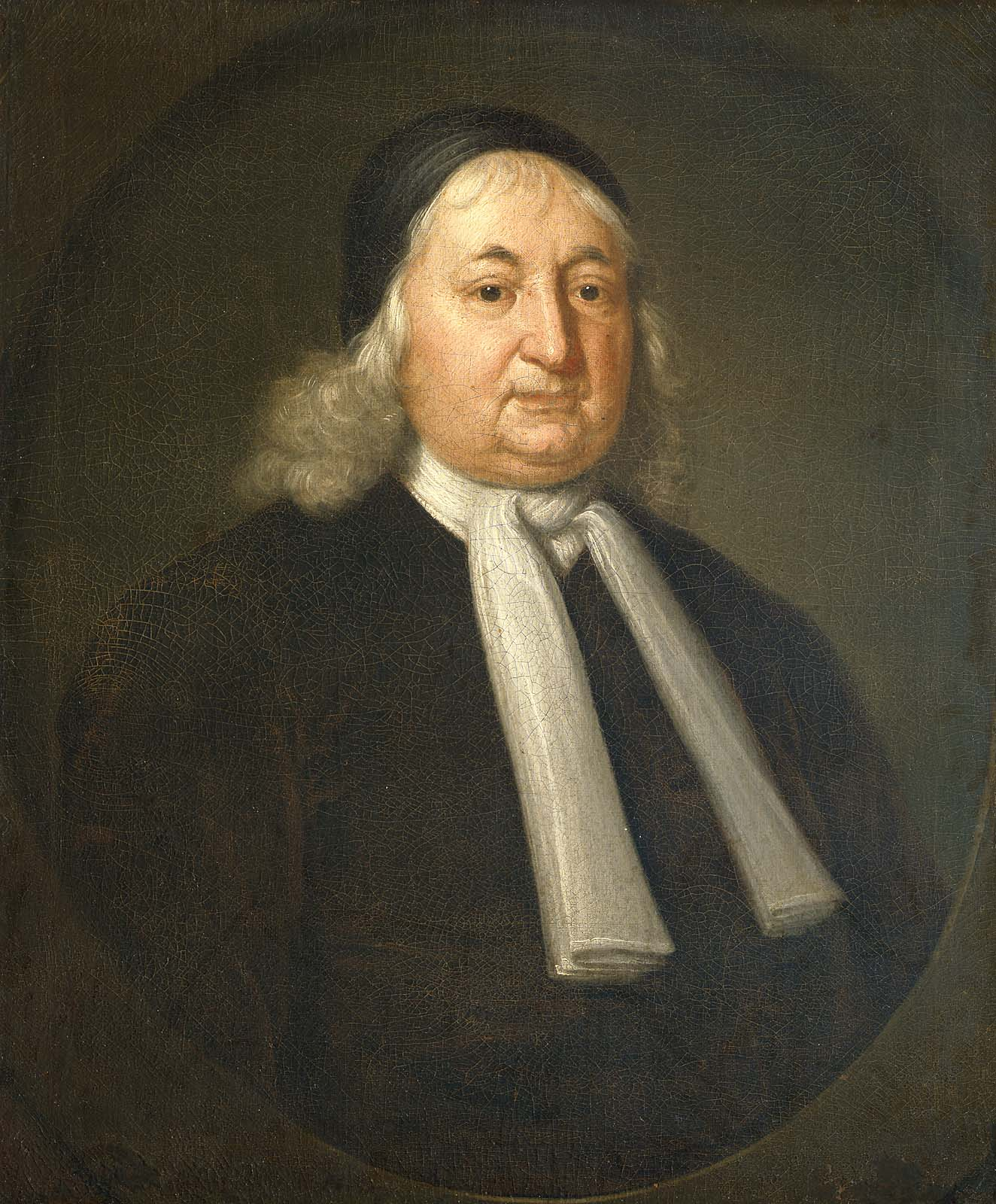
Samuel Sewall

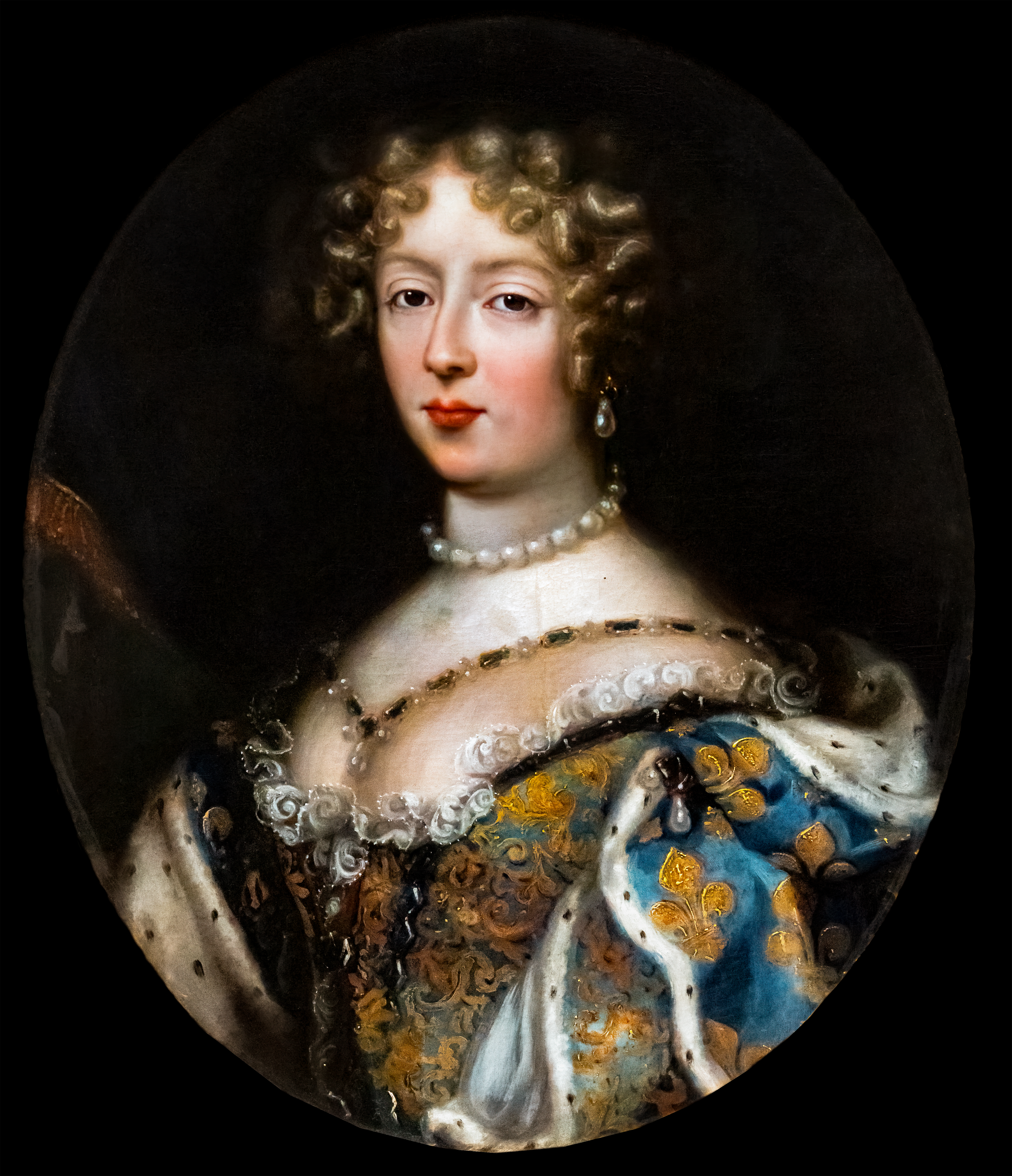
Princess Elisabeth Charlotte

- January 2
  - Sir Gilbert Heathcote, 1st Baronet, Lord Mayor of London (d. 1733)
  - Michel Chamillart, French statesman (d. 1721)
- January 7 – Pavao Ritter Vitezović, Croatian historian (d. 1713)
- January 8 – Wilhelm Homberg, Dutch alchemist (d. 1715)
- January 11 – Eugen Alexander Franz, 1st Prince of Thurn and Taxis, Germany (d. 1714)
- January 13 – Henry Booth, 1st Earl of Warrington, English politician (d. 1694)
- January 16 – Anthony Ashley-Cooper, 2nd Earl of Shaftesbury, English politician (d. 1699)
- January 17 – Claude-Guy Hallé, French painter (d. 1736)
- February 6 – Francesco Pignatelli, Italian Catholic cardinal (d. 1734)
- February 13
  - Anton Domenico Gabbiani, Italian painter (d. 1726)
  - August, Duke of Schleswig-Holstein-Sonderburg-Beck (d. 1689)
- February 14 – Camille d'Hostun, duc de Tallard, Marshal of France (d. 1728)
- March 1 – Louis de Sabran, British theologian (d. 1732)
- March 3 – Thomas Otway, English dramatist (d. 1685)
- March 10 – Giacomo Serpotta, Italian artist (d. 1732)
- March 12 – Johann Heinrich Ernesti, German philosopher, theologian (d. 1729)
- March 14 – Benedicta Henrietta of the Palatinate, German princess (d. 1730)
- March 20 – Leon Bazyli Sapieha, Polish-Lithuanian politician (d. 1686)
- March 21 – Piers Butler, 3rd Viscount Galmoye, Anglo-Irish nobleman (d. 1740)
- March 28 – Samuel Sewall, English-born Massachusetts judge (d. 1730)
- April 7 – Pope Clement XII (d. 1740)
- April 9
  - Jean Le Fèvre (astronomer), French astronomer (d. 1706)
  - Christian Ulrich I, Duke of Württemberg-Oels (d. 1704)
- April 13 – Thomas Ward (author), English writer (d. 1708)
- April 21 – Michel Rolle, French mathematician (d. 1719)
- April 25
  - Boris Sheremetev, Russian noble (d. 1719)
  - Giovanni Battista Foggini, Italian artist (d. 1725)
- April 28 – Magdalena Sibylla of Hesse-Darmstadt, regent and composer (d. 1712)
- May 1 – John King (rector of Chelsea), English churchman (d. 1732)
- May 2 – Abraham Hinckelmann, German Protestant theologian (d. 1695)
- May 7 – Edward Northey (barrister), British barrister and politician (d. 1723)
- May 11 – Johann Philipp d'Arco, Austrian soldier (d. 1704)
- May 14
  - Juliana of Hesse-Eschwege, German noblewoman (d. 1693)
  - Johann Philipp Förtsch, German opera composer (d. 1732)
- May 20 – Ichijō Kaneteru, Japanese court noble (d. 1705)
- May 27 – Elizabeth Charlotte, Princess Palatine, wife to Philippe I, Duke of Orléans (d. 1722)
- June 1 – Juan Ferreras, Spanish priest (d. 1735)
- June 23 – Jan Brokoff, German sculptor (d. 1718)
- August 3 – Samuel Western, English politician (d. 1699)
- August 15
  - John Grubb, American politician (d. 1708)
  - John Wise (clergyman), American Christian clergyman (d. 1725)
- August 26 – Tsarevna Marfa Alekseyevna of Russia (d. 1707)
- August 31 – Ferdinando Carlo Gonzaga, Duke of Mantua and Montferrat, only child of Duke Charles II (d. 1708)
- September 4
  - Jean Orry, French economist (d. 1719)
  - Tokugawa Tsunanari, Japanese daimyō (d. 1699)
- September 8 – Luisa Roldán, Spanish artist (d. 1706)
- September 10 – Jan Sladký Kozina, Czech revolutionary (d. 1695)
- September 12 – Frederick Charles, Duke of Württemberg-Winnental (d. 1697)
- October 11 – Nathaniel Higginson, English politician (d. 1708)
- October 16
  - Karl, Prince of Anhalt-Zerbst (d. 1718)
  - Jan Mortel, painter from the Northern Netherlands (d. 1719)
- October 29 – Jan Wyck, Dutch military painter (d. 1702)
- November 1 – William Lowndes, English politician (d. 1724)
- November 3 – Louis, Duke of Rohan, French noble (d. 1727)
- November 4 – Marc-René de Voyer de Paulmy d'Argenson (1652–1721), French politician (d. 1721)
- November 9 – Marie Anne d'Orléans, French princess (d. 1656)
- November 10 – Johann Ernst Glück, German theologian, translator (d. 1705)
- December 2 – Karolina of Legnica-Brieg, Silesian noblewoman (d. 1707)
- December 9
  - Augustus Quirinus Rivinus, German physician and botanist (d. 1723)
  - Robert Rochfort, Irish politician (d. 1727)
- December 10 – Frederick, Duke of Schleswig-Holstein-Sonderburg-Augustenburg, German nobleman (d. 1692)
- December 20 – Samuel Bradford, English churchman, Whig politician (d. 1731)
- December 25 – Archibald Pitcairne, Scottish physician (d. 1713)

== Deaths ==
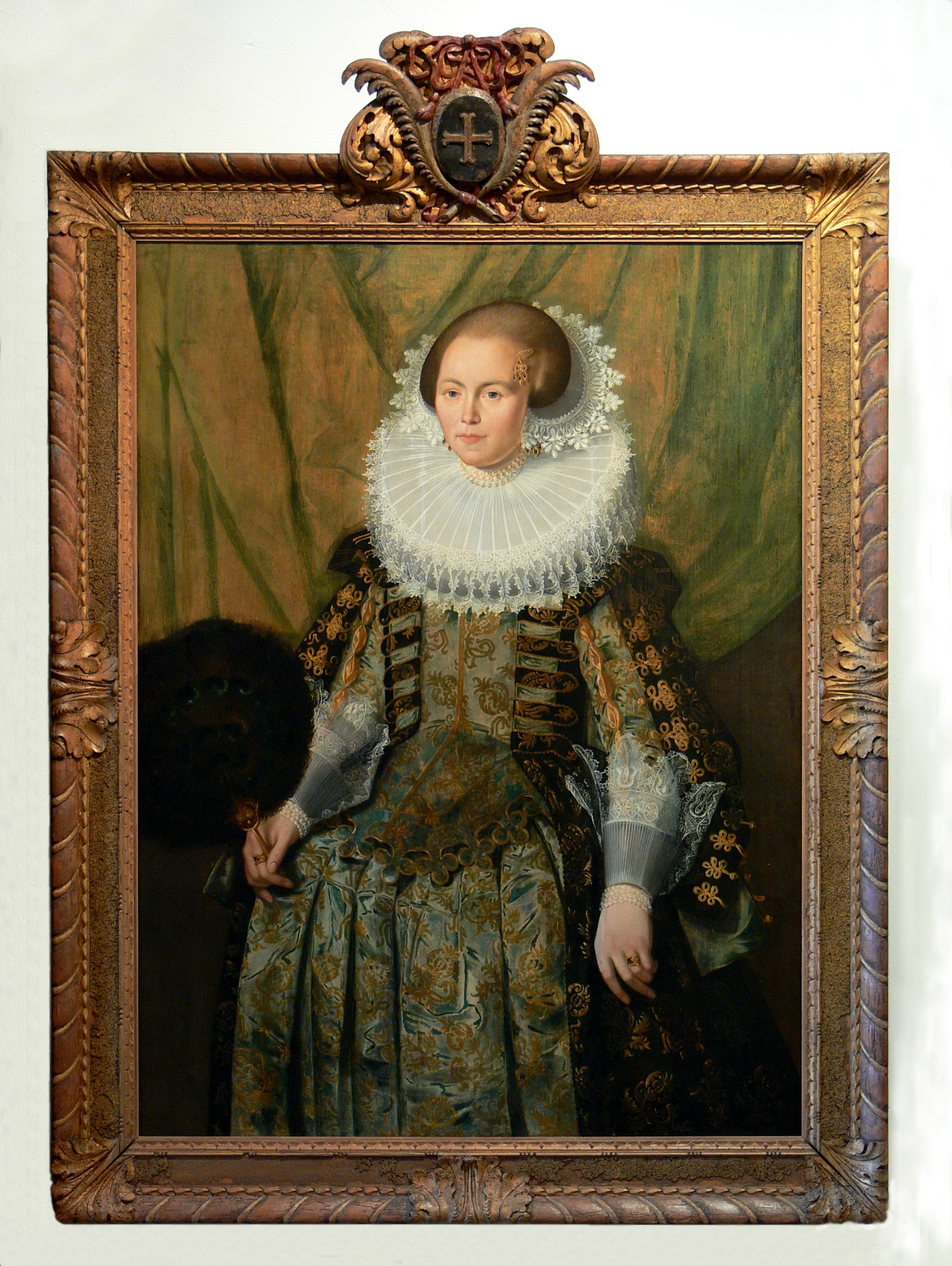
Eva Ment

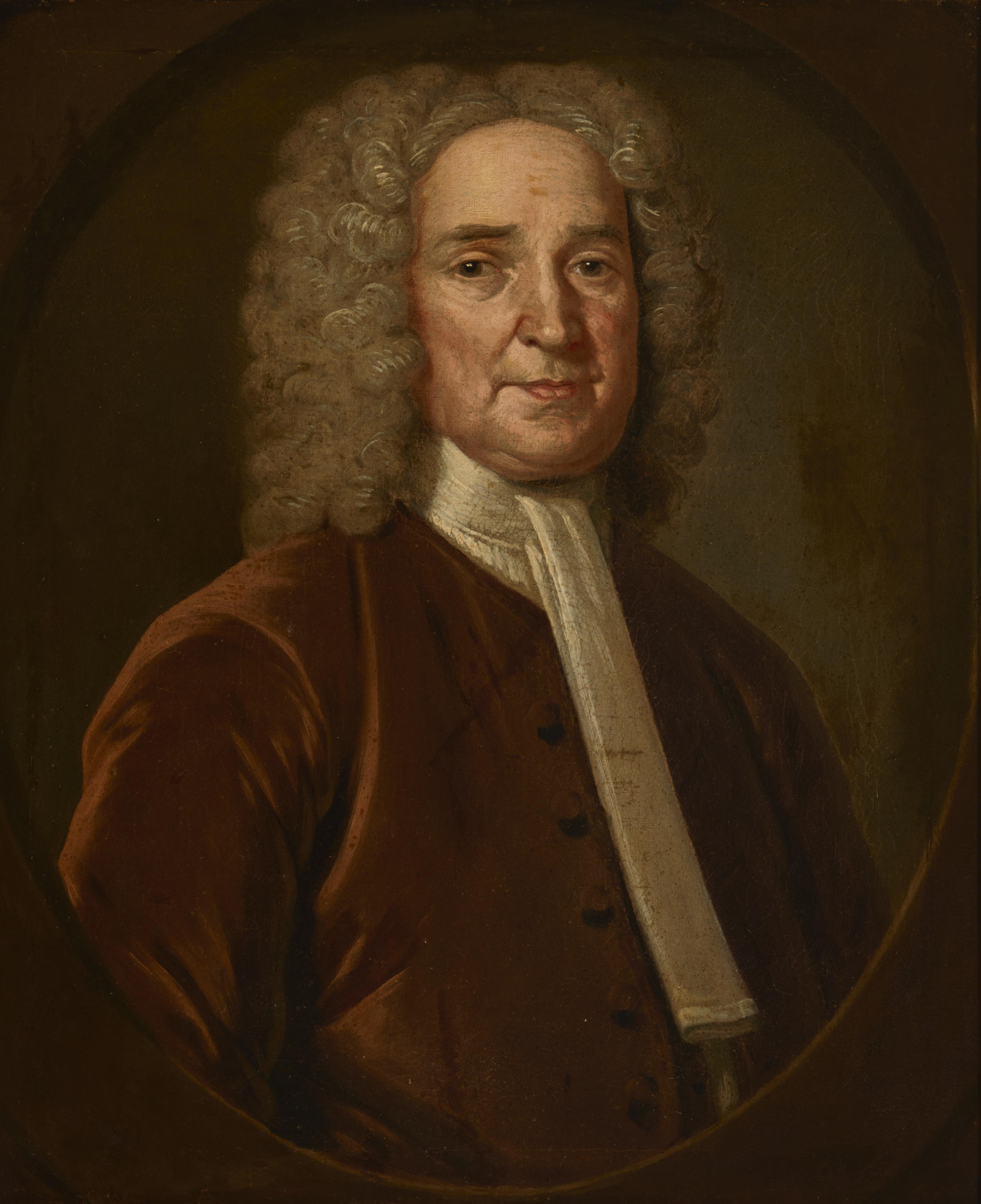
John Cotton

- January 19 – Vilem Slavata of Chlum, Czech nobleman (b. 1572)
- January 30 – Georges de La Tour, French Baroque painter (b. 1593)
- February 7 – Gregorio Allegri, Italian composer (b. 1582)
- February 28 – Arcangela Tarabotti, Venetian nun and feminist (b. 1604)
- March 12 – Aloysius Gottifredi, Italian Jesuit (b. 1595)
- March 16 – Beata Oxenstierna, Swedish aristocrat (b. 1591)
- March 17 – Benjamin Bramer, German mathematician (b. 1588)
- April 13 – Georges Fournier, French Jesuit mathematician and geographer (b. 1595)
- April 17 – Henry Howard, 22nd Earl of Arundel, English politician (b. 1608)
- April 19 – Jesper Brochmand, Danish bishop (b. 1585)
- April 21 – Pietro Della Valle, Italian traveller (b. 1586)
- April 26 – Jean-Pierre Camus, French Catholic bishop (b. 1584)
- May 11 (bur.) – Eva Ment, Dutch culture personality (b. 1606)
- May 10
  - Jacques Buteux, French missionary (b. 1600)
  - Jacques-Nompar de Caumont, duc de La Force, Marshal of France (b. 1558)
- June 3 – Marek Sobieski, Polish noble (szlachcic) (b. 1628)
- June 9
  - Anna Sophie of Anhalt, German noblewoman (b. 1584)
  - Jean Dolbeau, French missionary (b. 1586)
- June 18 – John Casimir, Count Palatine of Kleeburg, son of John I (b. 1589)
- June 21 – Inigo Jones, English architect (b. 1573)
- June 25 – Abraham von Franckenberg, German writer (b. 1593)
- July 14 – Otto Heurnius, Dutch physician and philosopher (b. 1577)
- July 23 – Johannes Chrysostomus vander Sterre, Dutch abbot, ecclesiastical writer (b. 1591)
- July 25 – Bonaventura Peeters the Elder, Flemish marine painter (b. 1614)
- July 30 – Charles Amadeus, Duke of Nemours (b. 1624)
- August 9 – Frédéric Maurice de La Tour d'Auvergne, prince of the independent principality of Sedan (b. 1605)
- August 10 – Jean Gaston, Duke of Valois (b. 1650)
- August 14 – Abraham Elzevir, Dutch printer (b. 1592)
- August 18 – Florimond de Beaune, French mathematician and jurist (b. 1601)
- August 22 – Jacob De la Gardie, Swedish soldier and statesman (b. 1583)
- August 23 – John Byron, 1st Baron Byron, English royalist politician (b. 1600)
- September 2 – Jusepe de Ribera, Spanish Tenebrist painter and printmaker (b. 1591)
- September 6 – Philippe Alegambe, Belgian Jesuit priest and bibliographer (b. 1592)
- September 7 – Patrick Young, Scottish librarian (b. 1584)
- September 16 – Giulio Roma, Italian Catholic cardinal (b. 1584)
- September 17 – Sumitomo Masatomo (b. 1585)
- October 8 – John Greaves, English mathematician and antiquarian (b. 1602)
- October 11 – Léon Bouthillier, comte de Chavigny, French politician (b. 1608)
- October 20 – Antonio Coello, Spanish writer (b. 1611)
- November 4 – Jean-Charles della Faille, Belgian mathematician (b. 1597)
- November 7 – Henry of Nassau-Siegen, German count, officer in the Dutch Army, diplomat for the Dutch Republic (b. 1611)
- November 11 – John Bridgeman, British bishop (b. 1577)
- November 21 – Jan Brożek, Polish mathematician, physician, and astronomer (b. 1585)
- December 11 – Denis Pétau, French theologian and historian (b. 1583)
- December 23 – John Cotton, founder of Boston, Massachusetts (b. 1585)
- date unknown
  - Johannes Gysius – Dutch historian (b. circa 1583)
  - Prince Luarsab of Kartli – heir apparent to the throne of the Kingdom of Kartli
