= Fall of Jayakarta =

1619 Dutch capture of Autonomous city of Banten

- Part of the Dutch colonial campaigns in Asia
- Founding of Batavia, by Barend Wijnveld.
Date	17–30 May 1619
Location	Jayakarta (present-day Jakarta)
Result	Dutch victory; Founding of Batavia
Territorial changes	Jayakarta was conquered by the VOC

Belligerents
Dutch East India Company	Banten Sultanate; Jayakarta

Commanders and leaders
Jan Pieterszoon Coen; Pieter de Carpentier	(Banten Sultanate) Jayawikarta (Banten Sultanate) Arya Ranamanggala

Strength
1,000 troops 16 ships	Thousands

The Fall of Jayakarta, also known as the conquest of Jacatra, was a military engagement between the Dutch East India Company (VOC) and the Banten Sultanate at Jayakarta in 1619, following the first Dutch attempt to conquer the city. It resulted in the Dutch seizure of Jayakarta and marked the beginning of the decline of the Banten Sultanate.

== Background ==
Tensions between Prince Jayawikarta and the Dutch escalated in 1618, when his soldiers besieged the Dutch fortress containing the Nassau and Mauritius warehouses. An English fleet of 15 ships arrived under Thomas Dale, former governor of the colony of Virginia. After a sea battle, the newly appointed Dutch governor Jan Pieterszoon Coen (JP Coen) escaped to the Moluccas to seek support; the Dutch had taken over the first of the Portuguese forts there in 1605. Dutch garrison commander Pieter van den Broecke and five other men were arrested during negotiations, as Jayawikarta believed that he had been deceived by the Dutch. Jayawikarta and the English then formed an alliance.

JP Coen's fleet robbed several Chinese ships (also known as junks) in the Java Sea, destroying Jepara Harbor before attacking Jayakarta. These acts were carried out by the Dutch East India Company (VOC), but under the colours of Britain's East India Company in order to damage relations between England and China, which had previously been amicable.

On 20 April 1619, JP Coen's fleet prepared to retaliate for the fall of the lodge and the siege of their castle (fortress) in Jayakarta. They also launched sieges on Bantenese outposts, resulting in the massacre of Bantenese forces.

== Invasion ==
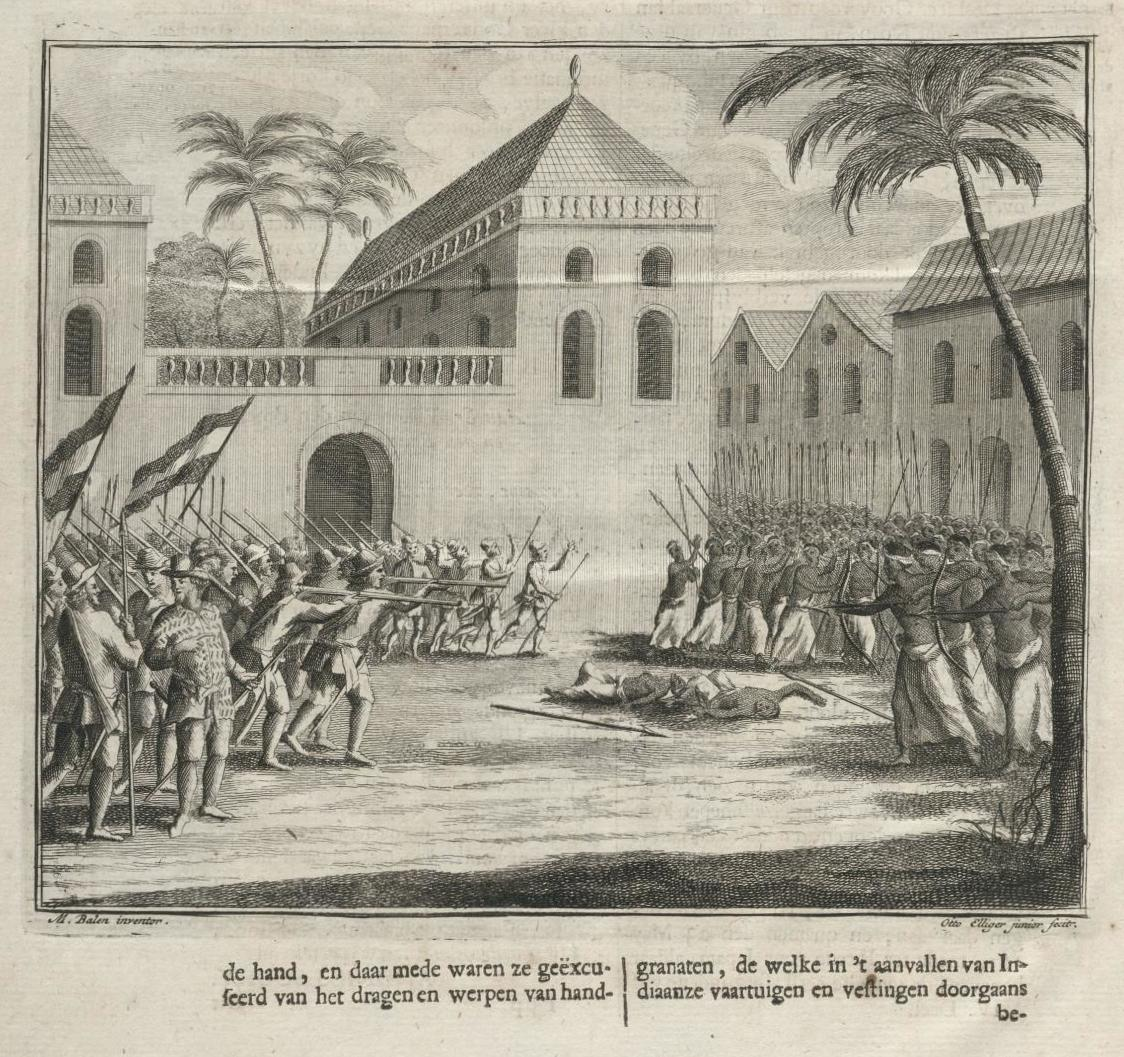
The conquest of Jacatra by the VOC in 1619. (1724 print)

On 17 May 1619, the VOC troops landed in Jayakarta and immediately attacked the Bantenese forts. The VOC force consisted of 1,000 troops fighting against thousands of Bantenese troops, while VOC soldiers burned down the houses of the native inhabitants of Jayakarta.

On 25 May, around sixteen VOC ships also attacked the coast and harbor of Banten.

On 28 May, Coen returned from the Moluccas with reinforcements. Two days later, on 30 May, the Dutch razed Jayakarta to the ground and expelled its population. Only the Luso-Sundanese padrão remained. Jayakarta was then completely captured by Dutch forces from the Bantenese troops.

== Aftermath ==
Jayawikarta retreated to Tanara, in the interior of Banten, where he later died. The Dutch established a closer relationship with Banten and assumed control of the port, which became the regional Dutch centre of power.

The region that became Batavia came under Dutch control in 1619, initially through the expansion of the original Dutch fort and the construction of a new building on the ruins of former Jayakarta. Coen decided to enlarge the original fort into a larger fortress on 2 July 1619 and sent plans for Batavia Castle to the Netherlands on 7 October of that year. The castle was larger than the previous one, with two northern bastions protecting it from maritime attack. The Nassau and Mauritius warehouses were expanded with the construction of an eastern fort extension, overseen by Commander Van Raay, on 12 March 1619.

Although Coen wanted to name the new settlement Nieuw-Hoorn after Hoorn (his birthplace), he was prevented from doing so by the board of the VOC. Batavia was chosen as the new name of the fort and settlement, and a naming ceremony was held on 18 January 1621. It was named after the Batavi, a Germanic tribe that inhabited the Batavian region during the Roman Empire; at the time, the tribe was believed to be the ancestor of the Dutch people. Jayakarta was known as Batavia for more than 300 years.

== Bibliography ==
- de Haan, F. (1922). Oud Batavia. Vol. 1. Batavia: G. Kolff & Co, Koninklijk Bataviaasch Genootschap van Kunsten en Wetenschappen.
- Corney, B. (1855). The voyage of Sir Henry Middleton to Bantam and Malocu Islands. Hakluyt Society.
