= Ferdinand Leenhoff =

Dutch painter and sculptor

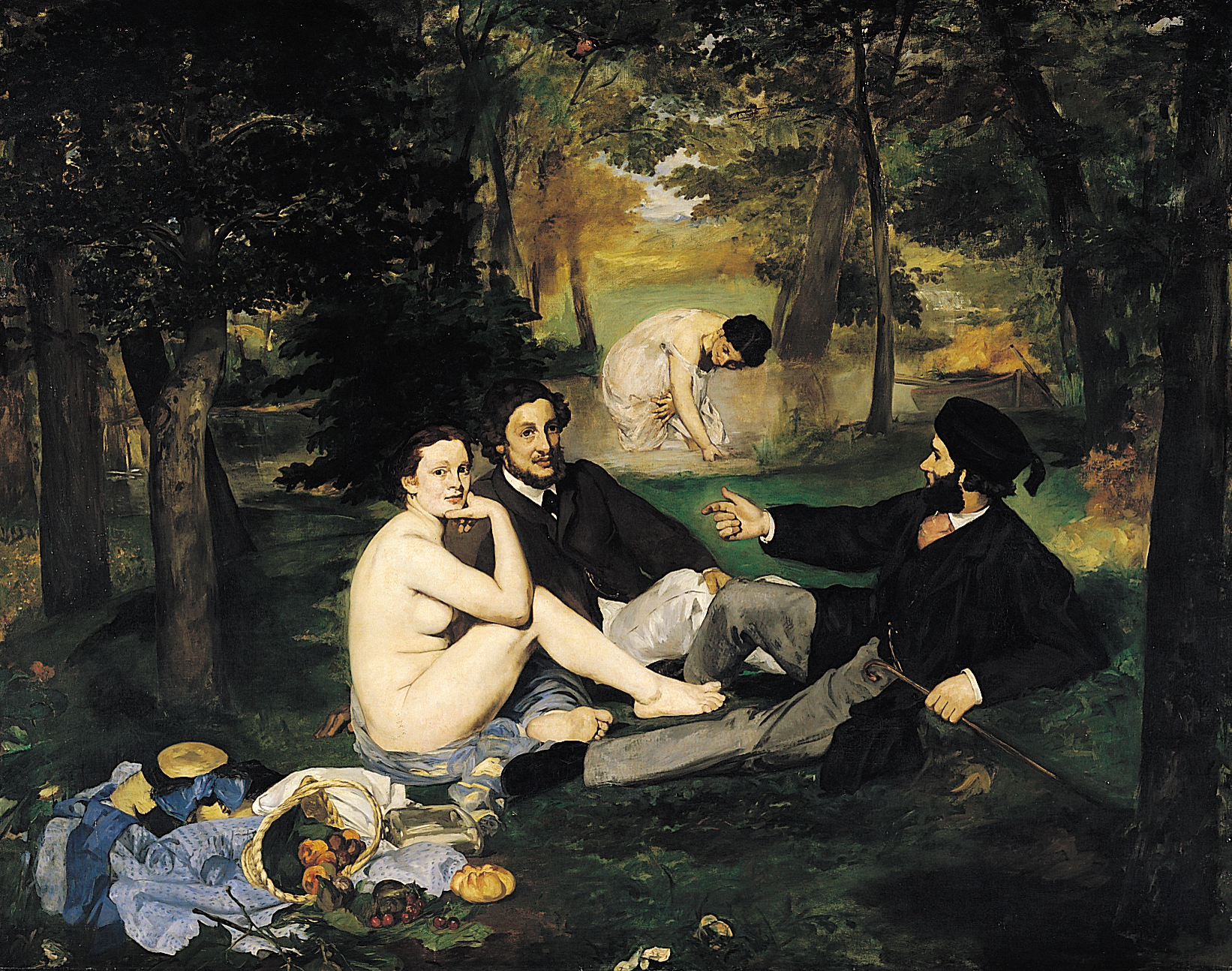
Édouard Manet, Le Déjeuner sur l'herbe (1863), Paris, musée d'Orsay. Ferdinand Leenhoff poses in the centre.

Ferdinand Karel Adolf Constantijn Leenhoff (24 May 1841 – 25 April 1914) was a Dutch painter and sculptor.

== Life ==
He was born in Zaltbommel to Carolus Antonius Leenhoff (1807–1878), a carillonneur and music professor, and Martina Adriana Johanna Ilcken (1807–1876). Around 1847, Ferdinand, his mother and some of his siblings moved to Paris to live with Ferdinand's grandmother. There he was pupil of Alphonse François. There his sister Suzanne met and later married the painter Édouard Manet, in the centre of whose Le Déjeuner sur l'herbe (1863) Leenhoff appears.

Leenhoff studied under Joseph Mezzara in Paris, with Mezzara later marrying Leenhoff's sister Mathilde. He later returned to the Netherlands and from 1890 to 1899 taught at Amsterdam's Rijksakademie van beeldende kunsten, before dying in Nice in 1914.

== Selected works ==
- Paris, cimetière de Passy : Bust of Édouard Manet, bronze, on the painter's grave.
- Amsterdam, Thorbeckeplein : Monument to Johan Rudolf Thorbecke, 1876.
- Hoorn : Monument to Jan Pieterszoon Coen, 1887.
- Utrecht, Domplein, in front of the Academiegebouw : Monument to Queen Wilhelmina of the Netherlands, 1892.
Works by Ferdinand Leenhoff

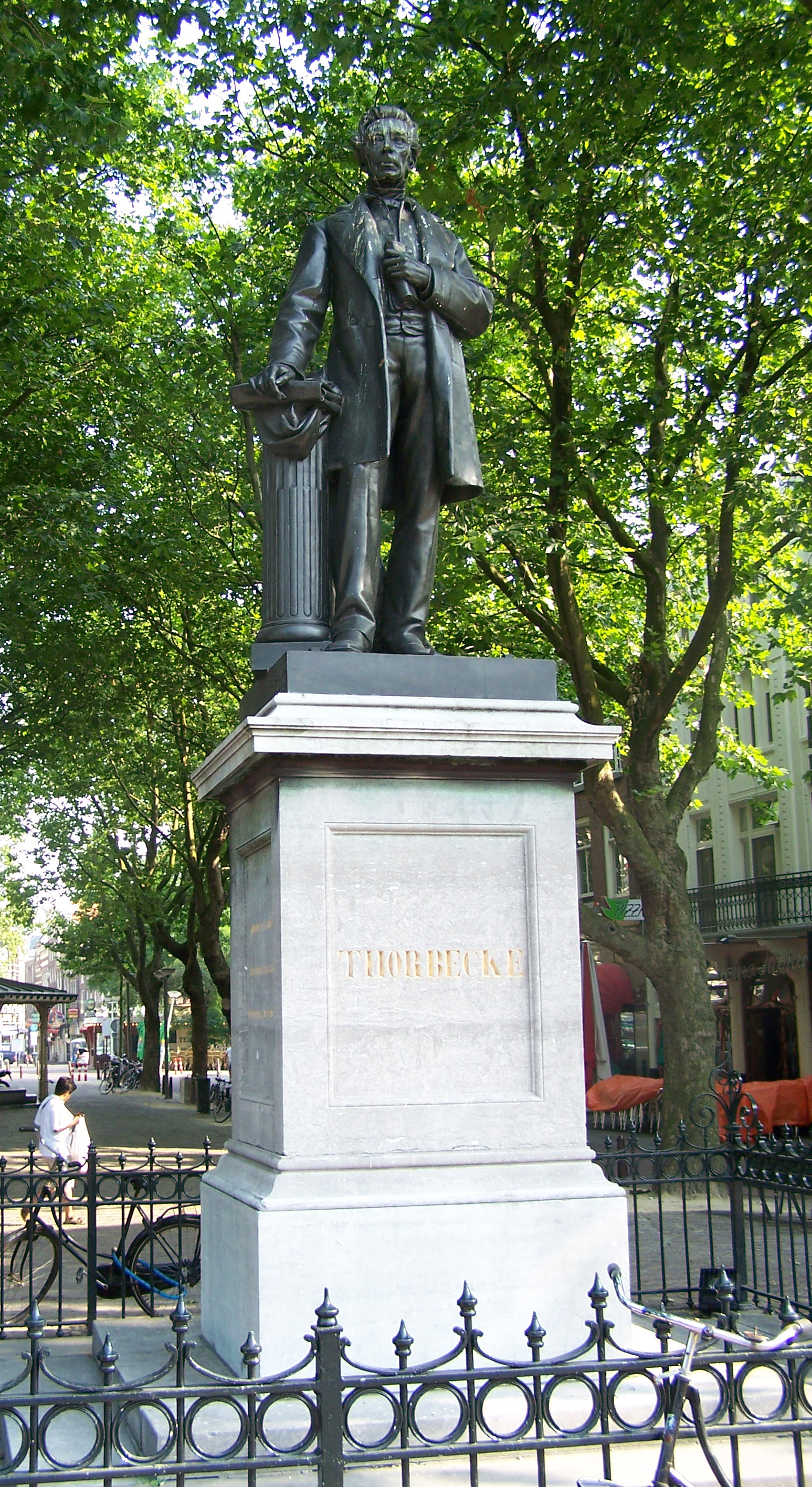
Monument to Johan Rudolf Thorbecke (1876), Thorbeckeplein, Amsterdam

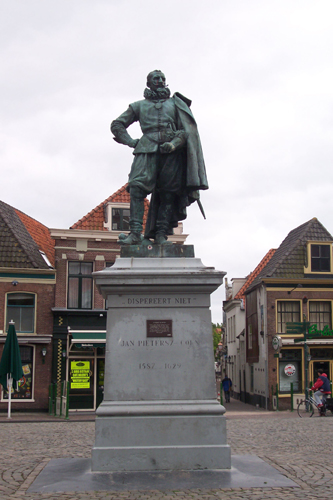
Monument to Jan Pieterszoon Coen (1887), Hoorn.

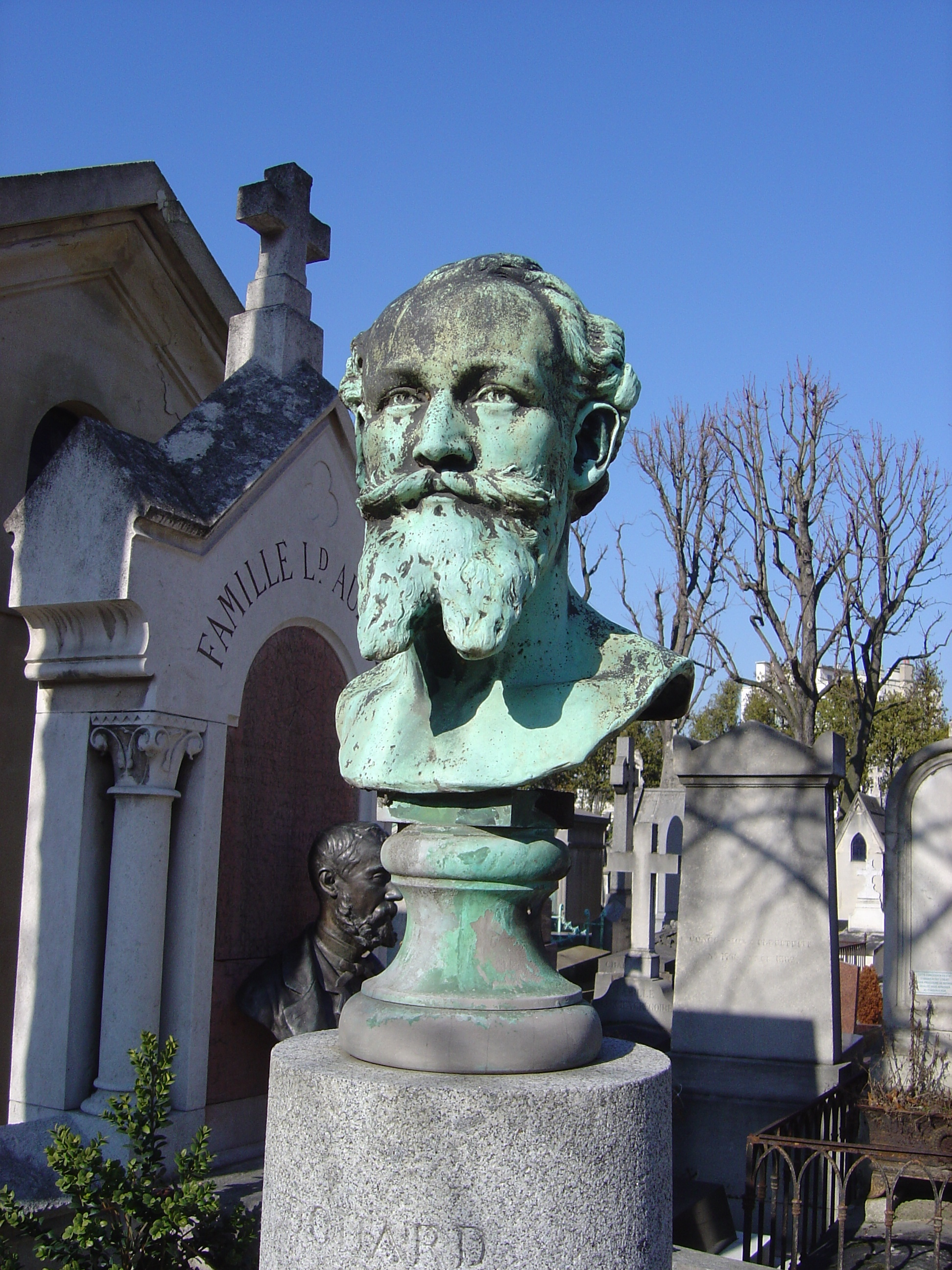
Bust of Édouard Manet, cimetière de Passy, Paris
