= Saartje Specx =

Saartje Specx (1617–1636) was the daughter of Jacques Specx, governor of the North Quarter of the Dutch East India Company's (VOC's) Asian trading empire, and a Japanese concubine.

Saartje (Sara in English) was born at the Dutch trading post on the island of Hirado. In 1629, aged 12, she was living in Batavia on Java under the protection of Jan Coen, governor of the Dutch East Indies, and Eva Ment. There she fell in love with 16-year-old Pieter Cortenhoeff, a half Dutch, half Burmese ensign in the VOC army, and was found having sex with him in Coen's residence. When the Governor heard of this, a contemporary writer attested, "his face turned white and his chair and the table trembled." Coen had Cortenhoeff beheaded and had to be dissuaded from having Saartje drowned. Instead she was severely flogged in front of the Town Hall of Batavia.

Under the rules governing the VOC's Asian possessions, Saartje Specx, as a part-Asian, had no right to live in the Netherlands. On her father's return to Java she married Georgius Candidius, a Calvinist minister, and accompanied him to the Dutch trading post in Formosa (Taiwan), where she died, aged 19, in 1636.

Jacob Cats wrote a pamphlet about the couple, which sold 50,000 copies. In 1931, J. Slauerhoff wrote a play about Jan Pieterszoon Coen, where the story was told again.
