= Cornélia Scheffer =

French sculptor

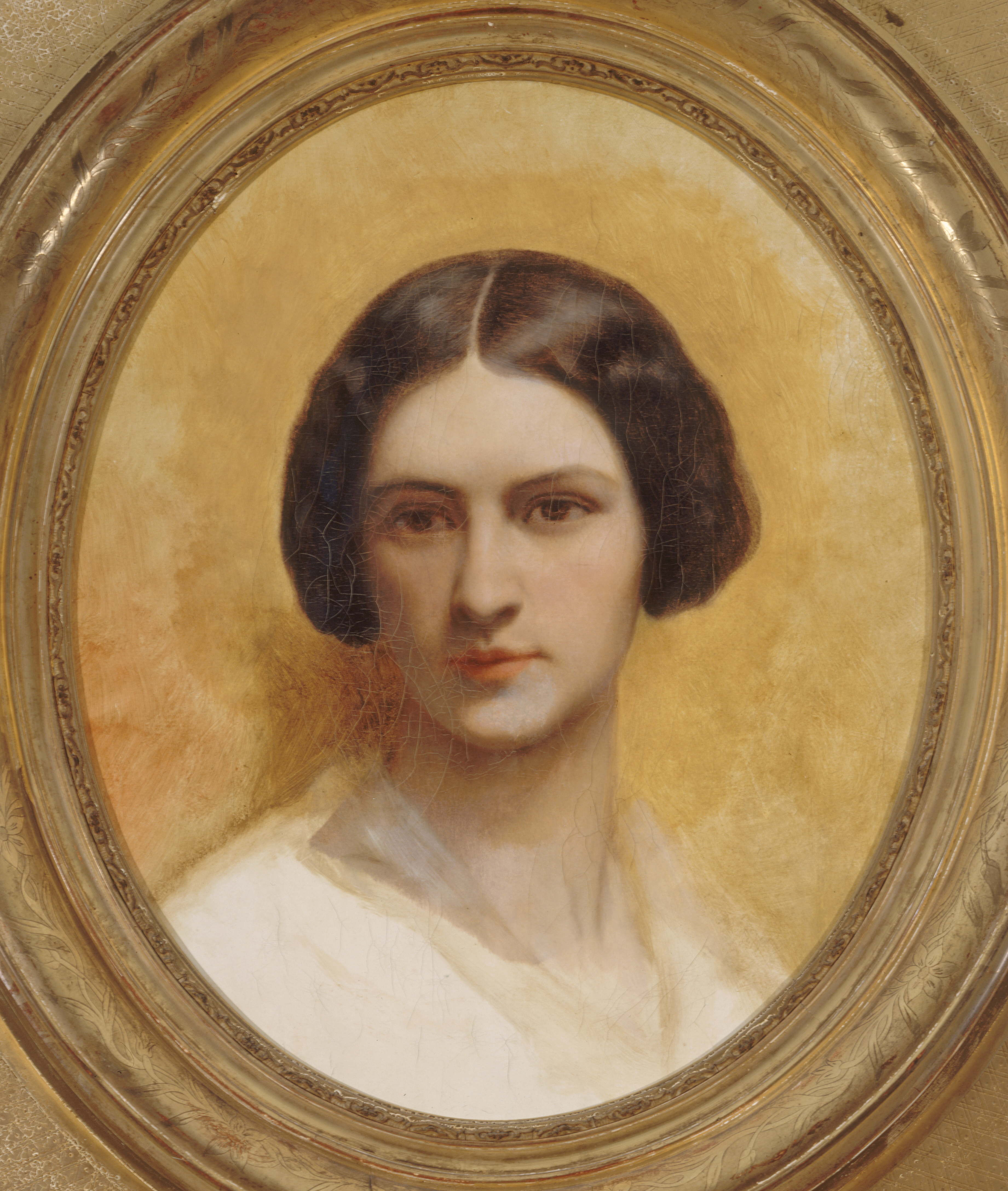
- Portrait of Cornélia by her father Ary, Musée de la Vie romantique, Paris.
- Born: Francès Cornélia Scheffer; 29 July 1830; Paris, France
- Died: 29 July 1899 (aged 68); Paris, France
- Known for: Sculpture, drawing, ceramic

Francès Cornélia Marjolin-Scheffer (29 July 1830 – 20 December 1899) was a French artist and designer, notable for her drawings, ceramics and sculptures.

== Life ==
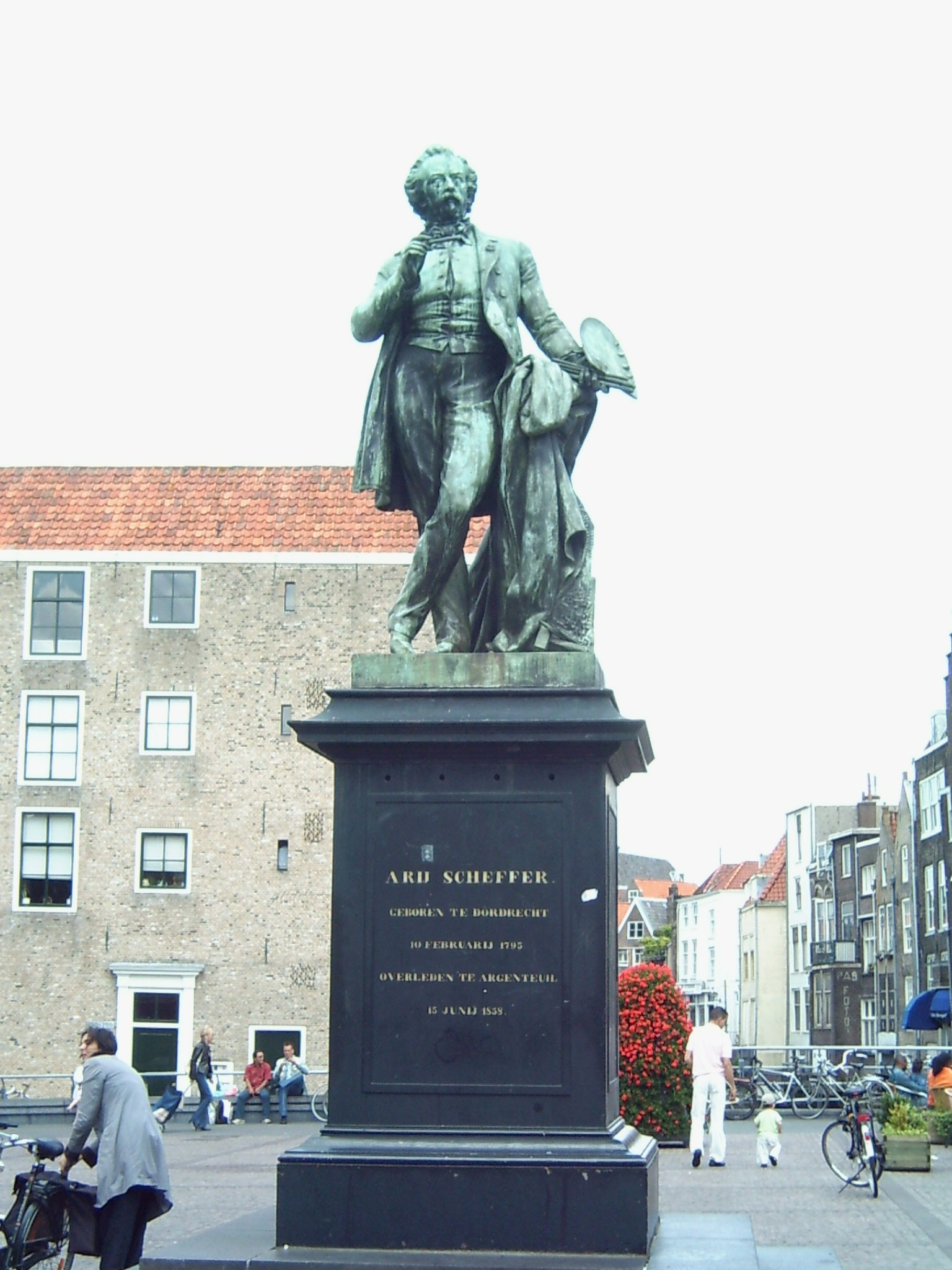
Cornélia Scheffer and Joseph Mezzara, Monument to Ary Scheffer (1862), Dordrecht

Born in Paris, Cornélia Scheffer was the daughter of the Dordrecht-born Ary Scheffer. In her birth registration, her father stated her mother's name as "Maria Johanna de Nes", but this is traditionally held to be a pseudonym for an anonymous woman of royal descent. Named after Ary's mother Cornelia, Cornélia was initially raised in the countryside but when she turned six she was entrusted to her paternal grandmother, Cornelia Scheffer-Lamme.

She spent much time at her father's studio on rue Chaptal in the Nouvelle Athènes in Paris, a district much-frequented by artists. Her father's brother Arie Johannes Lamme painted her sitting at a piano in the small studio. Cornélia herself produced several bust of figures such as her father and Goethe as well as copies of Ary's paintings in painted stone. In 1845 she married René Marjolin (1812–1895), a paediatrician and surgeon at the hôpital Sainte-Marguerite.

After her father's death she bought his studios and his rented house. Adjudging that Frédéric Auguste Bartholdi's designs for a monument to her father in Dordrecht was not sufficiently true to life, she and the sculptor Joseph Mezzara stepped in and designed it instead, though she was unable to attend its inauguration ceremony on 8 May 1862 due to illness. It was the Netherlands' first monument to a contemporary artist.

In the 1860s she designed pots to which Édouard Manet then added floral motifs. During the Franco-Prussian War in the following decade, she and her husband worked in a temporary hospital set up in her studio. She died in Paris on 20 December 1899 and was buried there in the family grave at the cimetière de Montmartre. She left several of her father's works to Dordrecht Museum, which also houses a number of her own works. Some of her works are also now in the Boijmans Van Beuningen Museum in Rotterdam.
