= Joseph Mezzara =

American sculptor

Joseph Ernest Amédée Mezzara (2 March 1820 – 12 July 1901) was a Franco-American sculptor.

== Life ==
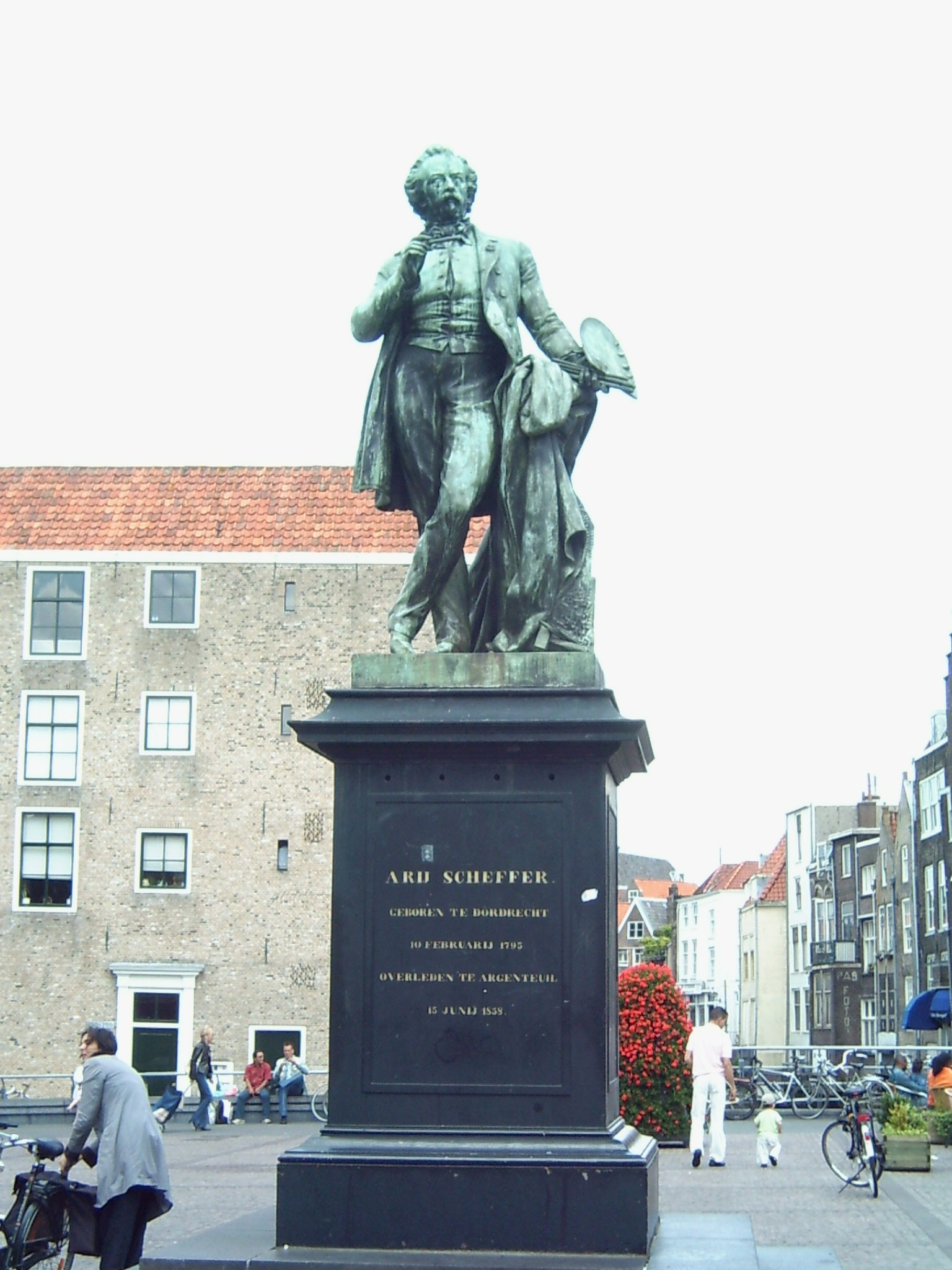
Monument to Ary Scheffer (1862), Dordrecht; co-designed with its subject's daughter Cornelia.

Born in New York, his parents Thomas François Gaspard Mezzara (1774-1845) and Marie Angélique Foulon were both painters. The Mezzara family alternated between France and America, but Joseph spent most of his youth in Paris, where he took lessons from the painters Jean-Pierre Granger and Ary Scheffer and the sculptor Pierre-Jean David d'Angers and from 1852 to 1875 exhibited at the Paris Salon. His works included a bust of Alfred de Musset in 1868, now in the foyer of the Comédie-Française.

One of Mezzara's own pupils was Ferdinand Leenhoff, whose sister Mathilde Mezzara married in 1856. This also made him brother-in-law to Suzanne and Édouard Manet. After Scheffer's death in 1858, he and Scheffer's daughter Cornélia Scheffer took over the designing of a monument to Ary in his native Dordrecht from Auguste Bartholdi - this became the Netherlands' first monument to a contemporary artist on its inauguration in 1862 in Mezzara's presence and was listed as a national monument in 2001. Mezzara died in the 6th arrondissement of Paris in 1901.
