= Pieter van den Broecke =

Dutch cloth merchant (1585–1640)

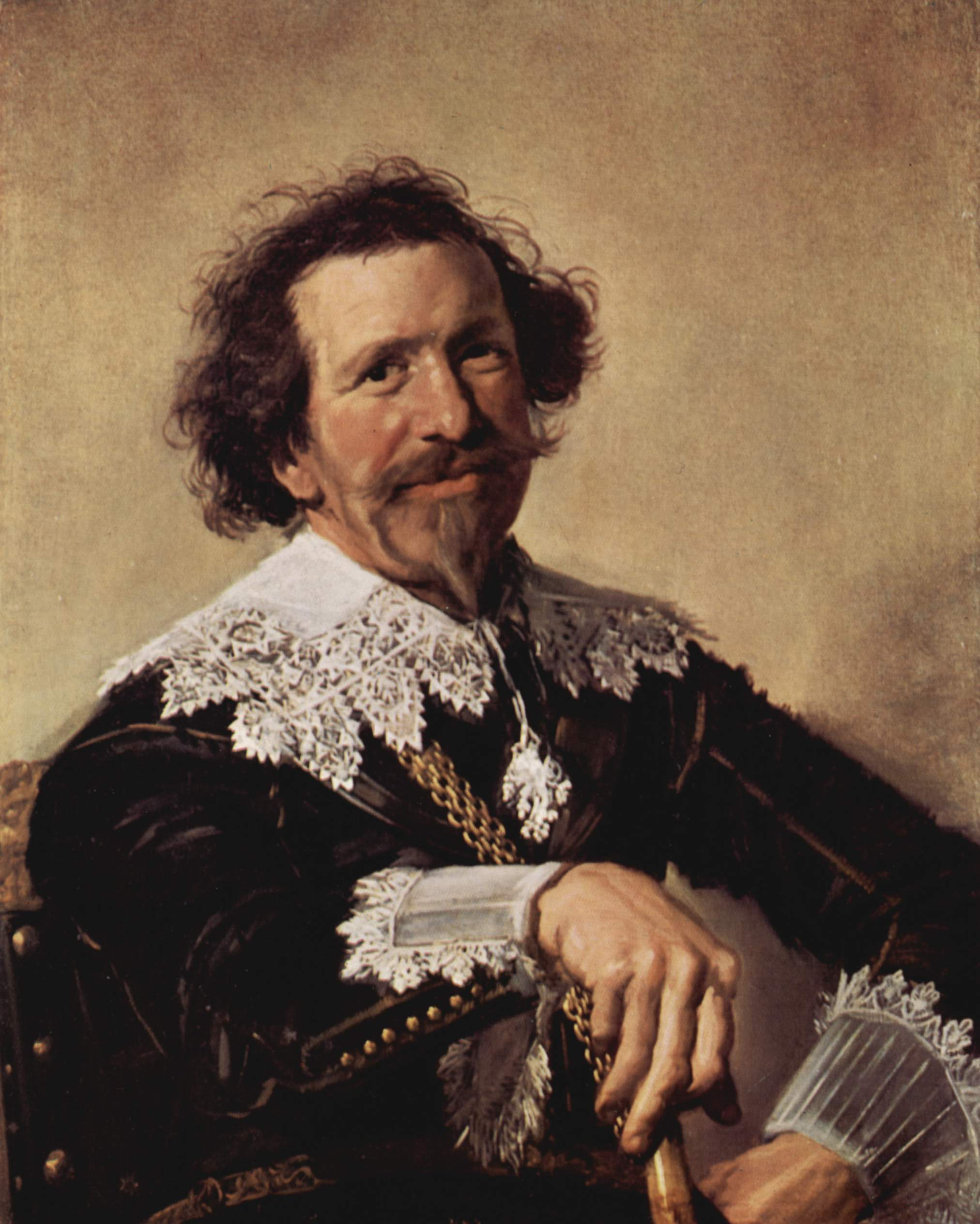
Pieter van den Broecke, by Frans Hals (Kenwood House)

Pieter van den Broecke (25 February 1585 – 1 December 1640) was a Dutch cloth merchant in the service of the Dutch East India Company (VOC), and one of the first Dutchmen to taste coffee. He also went to Angola three times. He was one of the first Europeans to describe societies in West and Central Africa and to comment in detail trade strategies along the African coast.

== Life ==
Van den Broecke was born on 25 February 1585 in Antwerp. His parents, Pieter van den Broecke Sr and Maiken de Morimont, lived in Antwerp. However, after the Fall of Antwerp to the Spanish, which happened at the year of his birth, Antwerp's Protestant population was given the choice of converting to the Roman Catholic Church or departing the city, though Protestants were given four years to settle their affairs before leaving. Van den Broecke's Calvinist parents were among the many who chose to depart, arriving first at Alkmaar in the new Dutch Republic. The family lived in Hamburg for a while and left around 1597 for Amsterdam. At the time the VOC began to develop, the younger Pieter joined it as a tradesman and climbed the career ladder. He became chief-tradesman and admiral.

In 1611 he brought in a cargo of 29 tonnes (65,000 pounds) of ivory to Amsterdam from a captured Portuguese ship. In 1614 he visited the port of Aden in Yemen. He was the first Dutch merchant to make a journey to the Arabian Peninsula. He went on to the port of al-Shihr in Hadramawt and left several Dutch merchants there to engage in trade and learn the Arabic language.

He returned to the Arabian Peninsula in 1616 and visited the port of Mokha, where he attempted, unsuccessfully, to establish a permanent Dutch trading establishment. It was there that he drank "something hot and black, a coffee".

He was made the VOC's manager in Dutch Suratte in 1620. He described the Ethiopian slave soldier Malik Ambar. From 1616 the establishment there blossomed, with new minor establishments being set up in the hinterland, though in 1617 the Duyfken, under his command, was wrecked on the Surat coast.

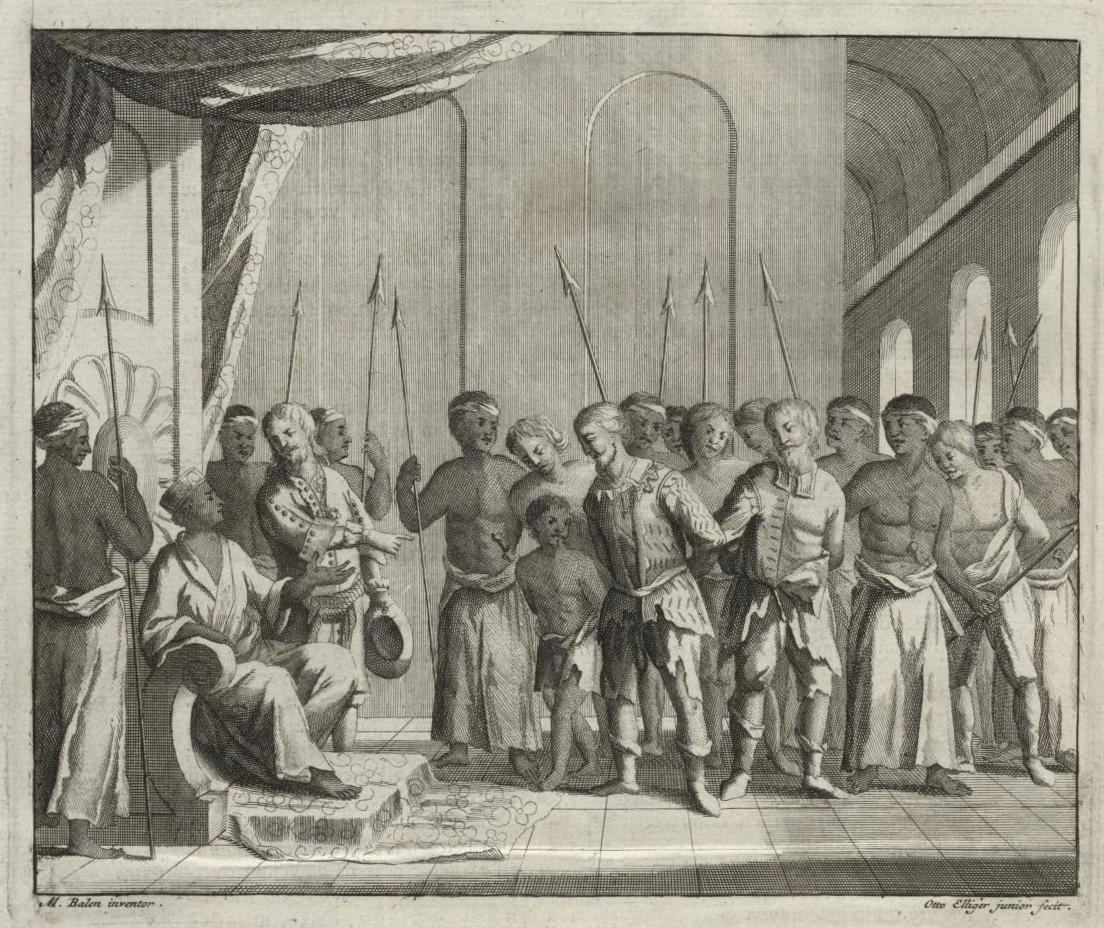
Illustration depicting about the Sultan of Mataram and the Dutch leader Pieter van den Broecke seen taken captive by the Javanese forces, François Valentyn in the book 1619.

He operated in Maritime Southeast Asia beside Jan Pieterszoon Coen and was present at the battle of Jakarta in 1619. Pieter van den Broecke took over from Coen as head of the Banda Islands. The islands were held to be important to trade due to their superior cloves and nutmeg, and so the Dutch were at that time enforcing a trade monopoly on the unwilling local population through drastic measures. So many inhabitants were killed on Banda that the island had to be deliberately repopulated.

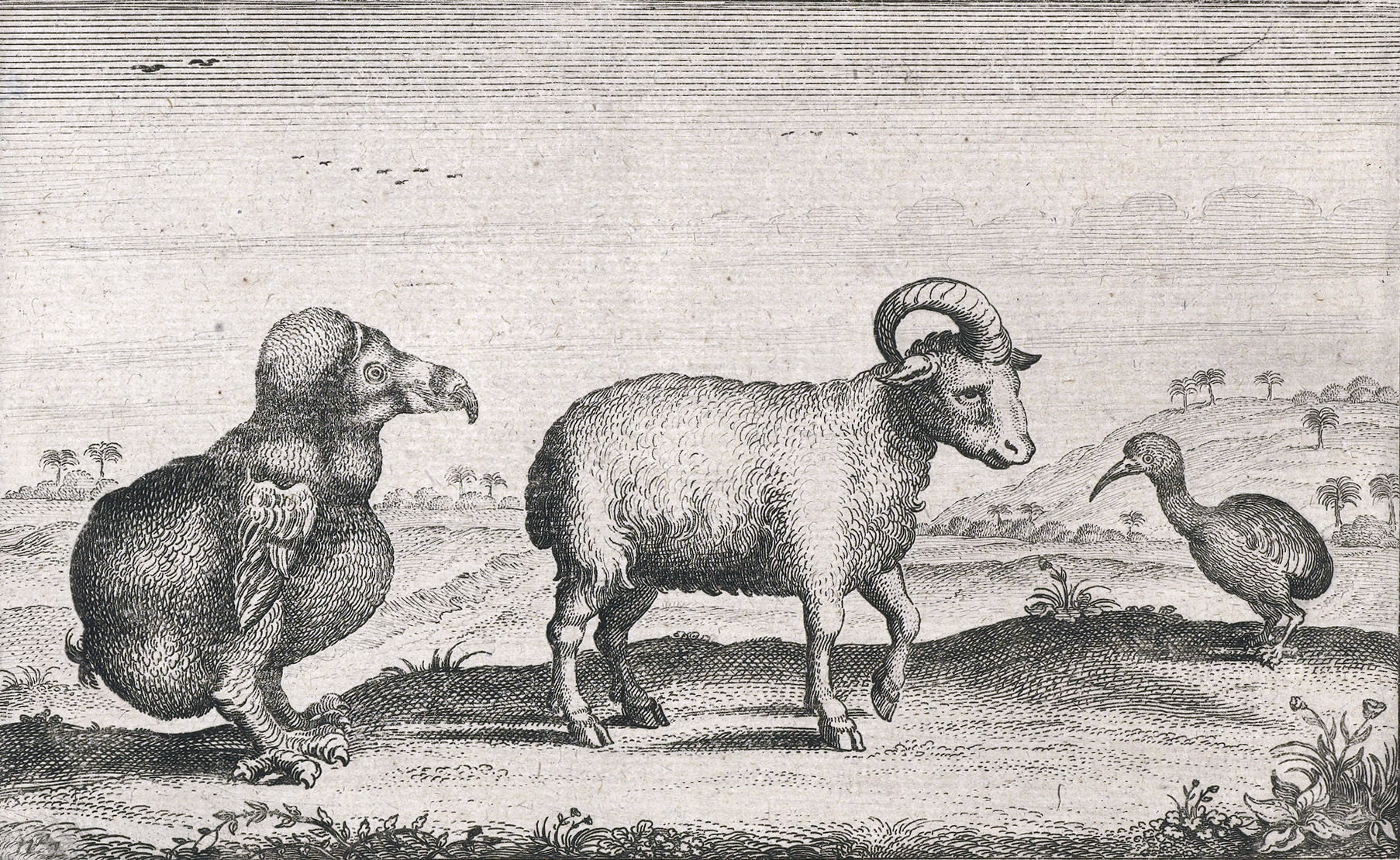
Pieter van den Broecke's 1617 drawing of a dodo, sheep, and red rail on Mauritius

On his retirement he was honoured with a gold chain, which he wears in the portrait by his friend Frans Hals (now hanging in Kenwood House). His son was a perkenier (plantation owner) on the Banda Islands. Descendants of the Van den Broecke family continue to live on Banda.

He died on 1 December 1640 in the Strait of Malacca.

== Works and sources ==
- Pieter van den Broecke: Korte historiael ende Journaelsche aenteyckeninghe, van al’t geen merck-waerdigh voorgevallen is, in de langhdurige Reysen, soo nae Cabo Verde, Angola [etc.] als insonderheyd van Oost-Indien, Hans Passchiers van Wesbusch, Haerlem (Haarlem) 1634
- Pieter van den Broecke, Klaas Ratelband: Reizen naar West-Afrika van Pieter van den Broecke, 1605–1614, Nijhoff, ’s-Gravenhage 1950.
- Pieter van den Broecke, Willem Philippus Coolhaas: Pieter van den Broecke in Azië, Nijhoff, ’s-Gravenhage 1962–1963.
- Pieter van den Broecke: Station Azoren, Boer, Bussum 1970
- Pieter van den Broecke, J. D. La Fleur: Pieter van den Broecke's journal of voyages to Cape Verde, Guinea and Angola (1605–1612), Hakluyt Society, London 2000.
- Femme Gaastra: De Geschiedenis van de VOC, Walburg Press, 2002.
