= Jan Pieterszoon Coen =

Dutch colonial administrator

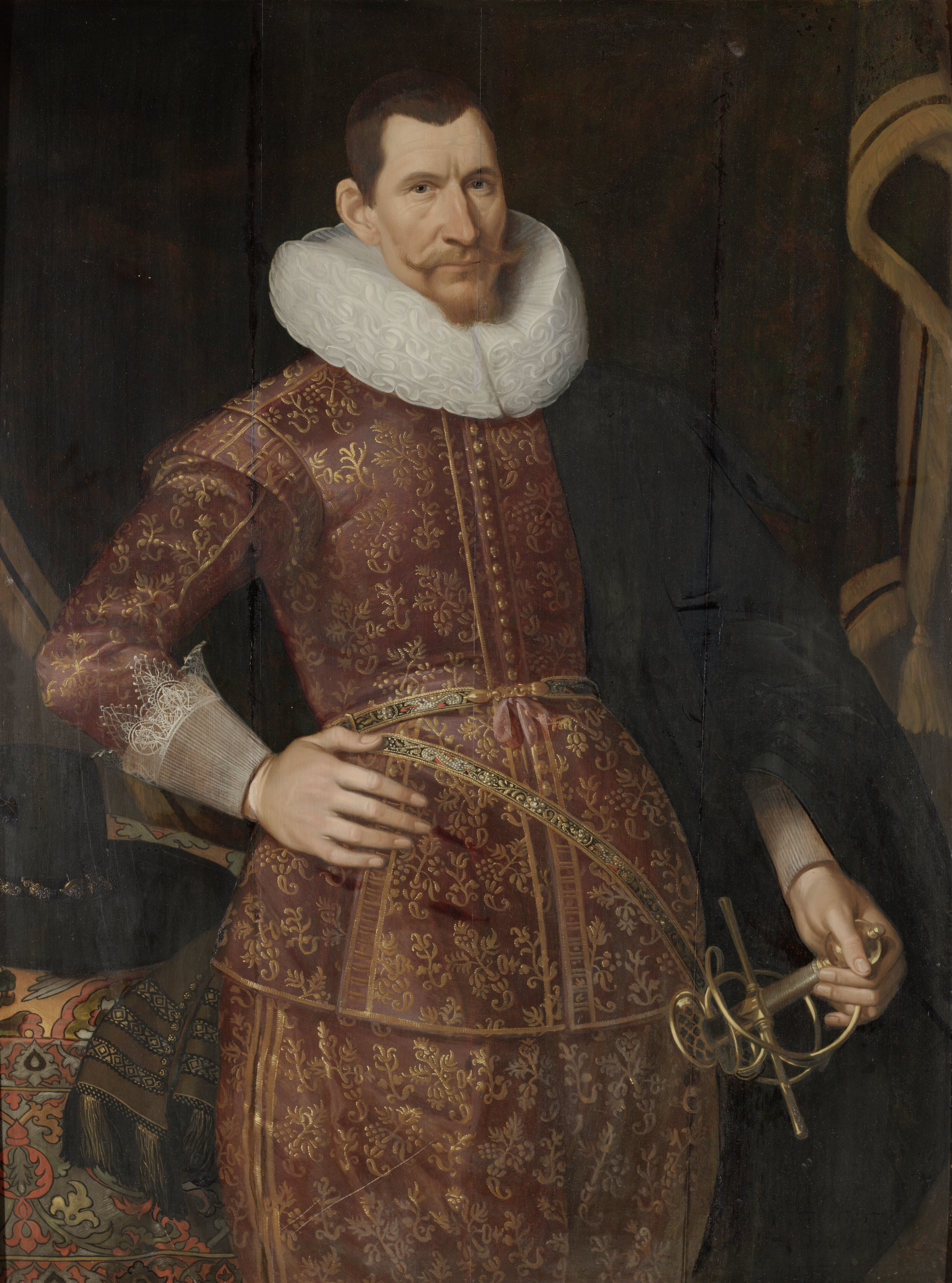
- Portrait by Jacob Waben

Governor-General of the Dutch East Indies
- In office 30 September 1627 – 21 September 1629
- Preceded by: Pieter de Carpentier
- Succeeded by: Jacques Specx
- In office 30 April 1618 – 1 February 1623
- Preceded by: Laurens Reael
- Succeeded by: Pieter de Carpentier

Personal details
- Born: 8 January 1587 Hoorn, Dutch Republic
- Died: 21 September 1629 (aged 42) Batavia, Dutch East Indies
- Spouse: Eva Ment (m. 1625)

Military service
- Battles/wars: Conquest of Banda Islands; Siege of Batavia; Jayakarta War; Conquest of Jacatra

Jan Pieterszoon Coen (Dutch pronunciation: [jɑn ˈpitərsoːn ˈkun]; 8 January 1587 – 21 September 1629) was a Dutch naval officer of the Dutch East India Company (VOC) in the early 17th century, serving two terms as governor-general of the Dutch East Indies. He was the founder of Batavia, capital of the Dutch East Indies. Renowned for providing the impulse that set the VOC on the path to dominance in the Dutch East Indies, he was long considered a national hero in the Netherlands. Since the 19th century, his legacy has become controversial due to the brutal violence he employed in order to secure a trade monopoly on nutmeg, mace and cloves. He led the final Dutch conquest of the Banda Islands in 1621, which culminated in the Banda massacre, which saw 2,800 Bandanese killed and 1,700 enslaved by the Dutch. This is regarded as an act of genocide and earned him the nickname of 'Butcher of Banda'.

A famous quote of his from 1618, Despair not, spare your enemies not, for God is with us, illustrates his single-minded ruthlessness, and his unstinting belief in the divinely-sanctioned nature of his project. Using such self-professed divine sanction to violently pursue his ultimate goal of a trade monopoly in the East Indies, Dutch soldiers acting on Coen's orders perpetrated numerous wanton acts of destruction in the spice islands of (now) eastern Indonesia, including the infamous Banda Massacre of 1621. The purpose of this was to gain a monopoly upon the supply of nutmeg and mace in order to sustain artificially high prices and profits for the Dutch investors in the VOC. This was deemed by many to be excessive, even for such a relatively violent age. Consequently, since Indonesia became independent he has been looked at in a more critical light, and historians view his often violent methods to have been excessive.

== Life ==
Coen was born in Hoorn on 8 January 1587 to a strict Calvinist family. In 1601, he travelled to Rome, to study trade in the offices of the Fleming Joost de Visscher, where he learned the art of bookkeeping. Joining the Dutch East India Company (VOC) in 1606, he made a trading voyage to the East Indies in 1607 with the fleet of Pieter Willemsz Verhoeff.

=== First VOC voyage and return (1607–1612) ===
During the journey, Verhoeff and 42 of his men were killed during negotiations with the chiefs of the Banda Islands.

After his return to the republic in 1610, Coen submitted an important report on trade possibilities in Southeast Asia to the company's directors. As a result of this report, he was again sent overseas in 1612, with the rank of chief merchant.

=== Second VOC voyage and promotion (1612–1617) ===
On the second trip, he acquitted himself so well of his commission and notable by the success of his practice of commerce, that in October 1613, he was appointed as accountant-general of all VOC offices in the East Indies and president of the head offices in Bantam and Sunda Kelapa.

In 1614, he was made director-general, second in command. On 25 October 1617, the Heren XVII of the VOC appointed him as the fourth governor-general in the East Indies, of which he was informed on 30 April 1618.

=== Conquest of Jayakarta and Banda (1618–1622) ===
As a merchant and Calvinist, Coen was convinced of the necessity of strict enforcement of contracts entered into with Asian rulers. He accordingly aided Indonesian princes against their indigenous rivals or against other European powers and was given commercial monopolies for the company in return. Thus the Dutch, at the price of heavy military and naval investment, slowly gained control of the area's rich spice trade.

Between 1614 and 1618, Coen secured a clove monopoly in the Moluccas and a nutmeg monopoly in the Banda Islands. The inhabitants of Banda had been selling the spices to the English and other Indonesians tribes owing to their offering better prices, despite contracts with the Dutch, which obliged them to sell only to the VOC, at low prices.

In 1621, he led the Dutch conquest of the Banda Islands, using Japanese mercenaries. After encountering some fierce resistance, mostly by cannons that the natives had acquired from the English, they took the island of Lonthor by force. 2,800 inhabitants were massacred and replaced by slave labor from other islands to make way for Dutch planters. Of the 15,000 inhabitants it is believed only about a thousand survived on the island. Eight hundred people were deported to Batavia.

Because of disputes at the head office in Bantam with natives, the Chinese, and the English, the VOC desired a better central headquarters. Coen thus directed more of the company's trade through Jakarta, where it had established a factory in 1610. However, not trusting the native ruler, he decided in 1618 to convert the Dutch warehouses into a fort. While away on an expedition, the English took control of the town. Coen managed to reconquer Jakarta in 1619, with fire destroying most of the town during the process. He rebuilt the city and fort, thus founding the new Dutch town over the ruins of its predecessor, which he forthwith proclaimed the capital of the Dutch East Indies. In 1621, the city was renamed Batavia. Coen preferred Nieuw Hoorn, after his hometown, but did not get his way.

=== Return to the Netherlands (1622–1627) ===
In 1622, Coen revisited Europe. On 1 February 1623, he handed his post to Pieter de Carpentier and returned to the Netherlands, where he was given a hero's welcome off the coast of Texel. He then became head of the VOC chamber in Hoorn and worked on establishing new policies. During his absence from the East Indies, difficulties with the English were exacerbated by the Dutch massacre of 21 Englishmen on Amboyna. On 3 October 1624, he was reappointed governor-general in the East Indies, but his departure was hindered by the English. In 1625, he married Eva Ment, and in 1627 departed incognito for the East Indies with his wife, their newborn child and her brother and sister, starting work on 30 September 1627. After his arrival, the English abandoned Batavia and established their headquarters in Bantam.

=== Last years (1627–1629) ===
Twice during Coen's term in office, Sultan Agung of Mataram besieged Batavia, in 1628 and 1629. Agung's military was poorly armed and had inadequate provisions of food, and was never able to capture the city. During Agung's second siege Coen suddenly died on 21 September 1629, likely due to the cholera outbreak in Batavia during this siege.

In Imogiri, there is a persistent folklore that Coen's remains were stolen from his grave in Jakarta, and placed under the steps leading up to Sultan Agung's grave.

== Legacy ==
He was long considered a national hero in the Netherlands. Since the 19th century, his legacy has become controversial due to the violence he employed, especially during the last stage of the Dutch conquest of the Banda Islands, which is widely considered a genocide.

Named for him are the Coentunnel and the Coenhaven in Amsterdam. There is also the Coen River in Queensland, Australia, named in 1653 by Jan Carstenszoon. There are a number of derived placenames including the town of Coen.

=== Statues ===
A statue to Coen was revealed in Batavia on 4 September 1876, in front of the Weltevreden Estate. It was destroyed by Japanese occupying forces on 7 March 1943.

Of the monuments that remember Coen in the Netherlands, the best-known is the Monument to Jan Pieterszoon Coen in Hoorn, with the motto "Dispereert niet" ("do not despair"). Made in 1887 by Ferdinand Leenhoff in bronze, it was placed on a central location in Hoorn, the Roode Steen, in 1893. Following a citizen's initiative, in 2012 the city council placed an additional text on the statue's pedestal, explaining the controversial nature of Coen's actions and legacy, and detailing some of his atrocities.

A statue for Coen in Amsterdam, on one of the corners of the Beurs van Berlage, also includes the "Dispereert niet" motto.

Statue for Coen in Batavia

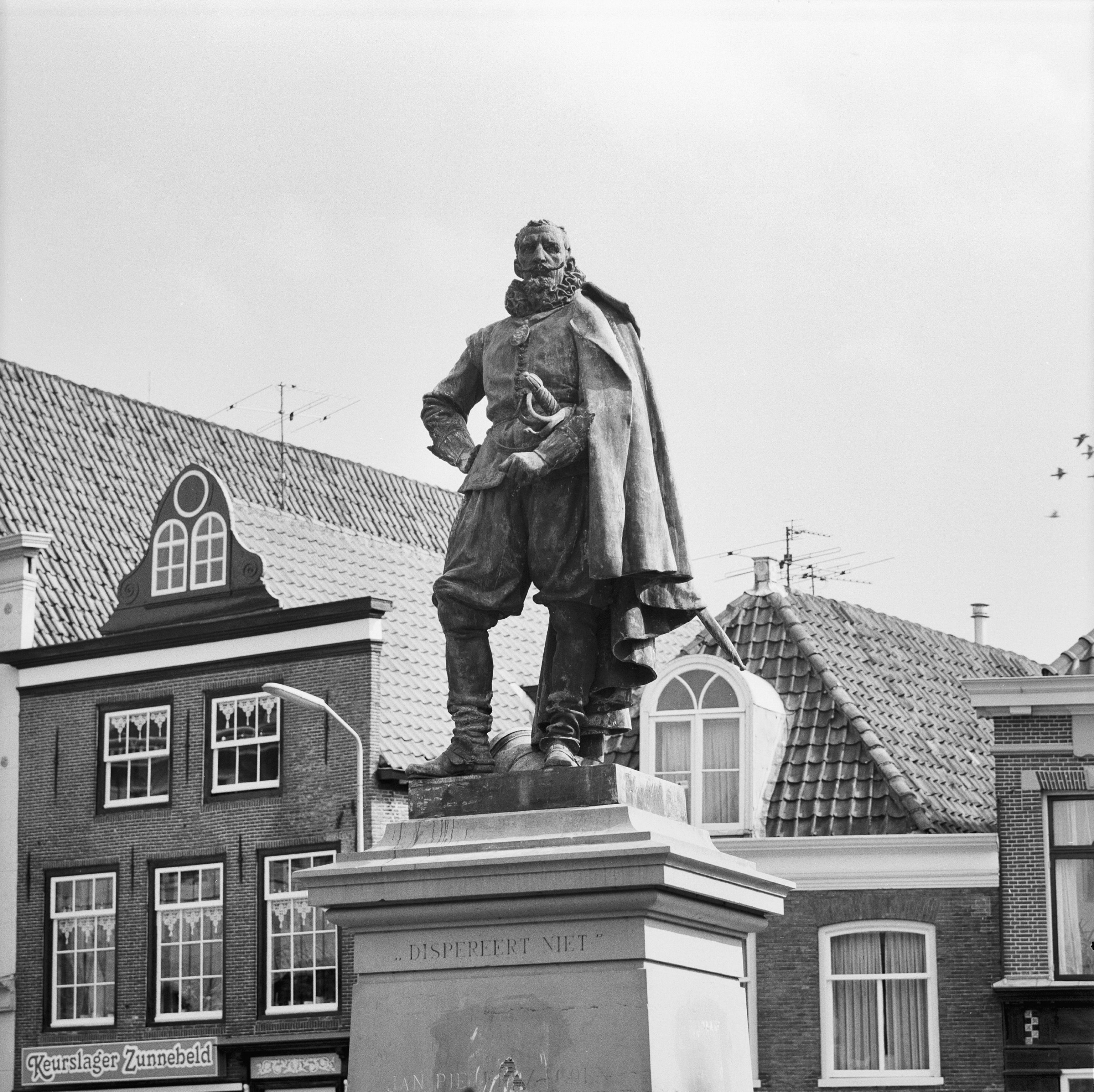
Monument to Coen in Hoorn

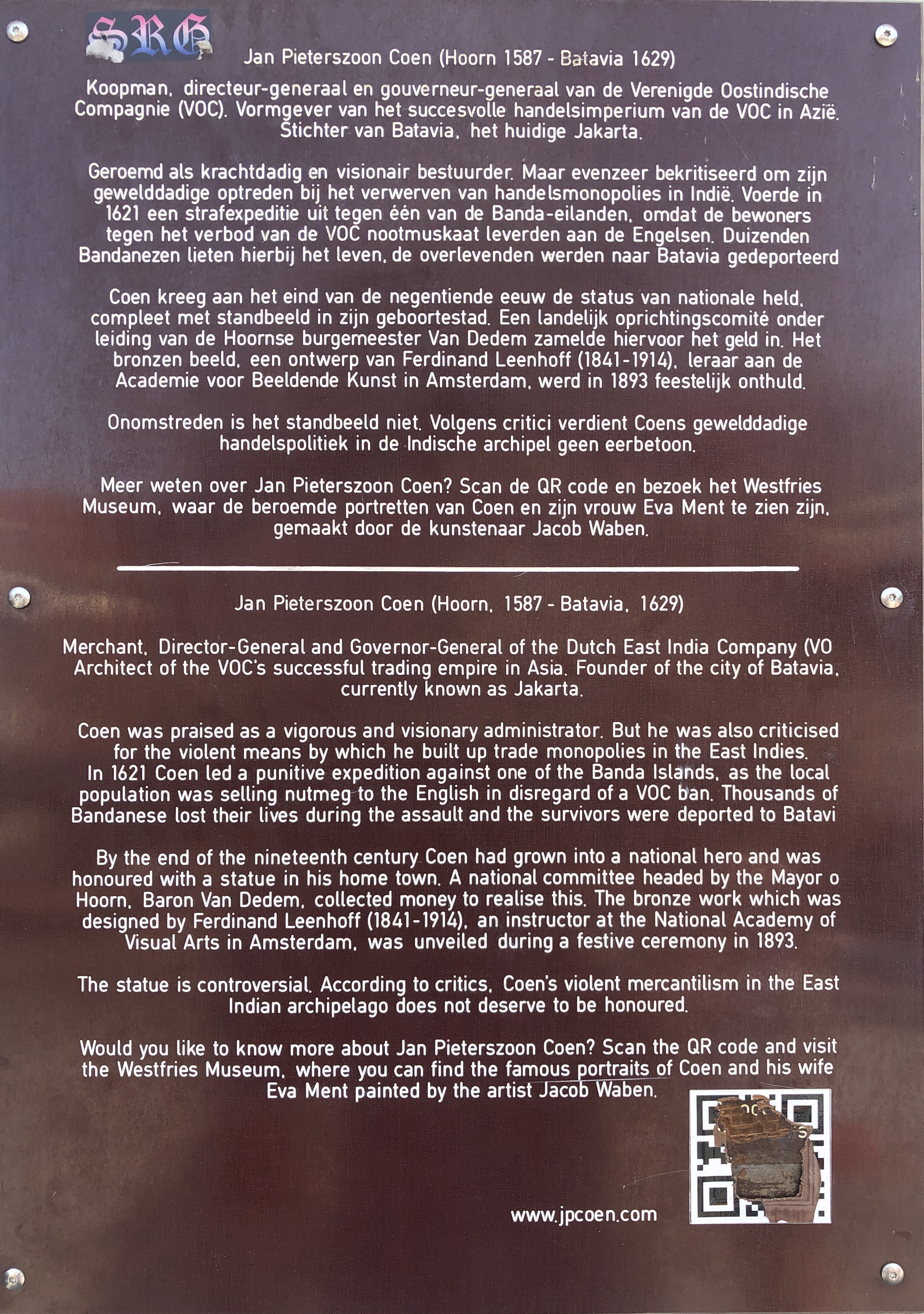
Explanatory text placed in 2012 on the pedestal of the Hoorn statue

== See also ==
- Saartje Specx

== Sources ==
- Milton, G. (2000). Nathaniel's Nutmeg: Or, the true and incredible adventure of the spice trader who changed the course of history. New York: Penguin. ISBN 9780140292602.
- Stapel, F. W. (1924). "Coen (Jan Pieterszoon)". Nieuw Nederlandsch Biografisch Woordenboek (in Dutch). Vol. 6. Leiden: Sijthoff. pp. 311–316. ISBN 9781466873476. OCLC 614113052.
- Van der Aa, A. J. (1858). "Coen (Jan Pieterszoon)". Biographisch Woordenboek der Nederlanden (in Dutch). Vol. 3. Haarlem: Brederode. pp. 581–586. ISBN 9781466873476. OCLC 831874948.
- Vanvugt, E. (1996). Nestbevuilers: 400 jaar Nederlandse critici van het koloniale bewind in de Oost en de West (in Dutch). Amsterdam: Babylon-De Geus. ISBN 9789062223138.
