= Juan Ferreras =

The Most Excellent Juan Ferreras
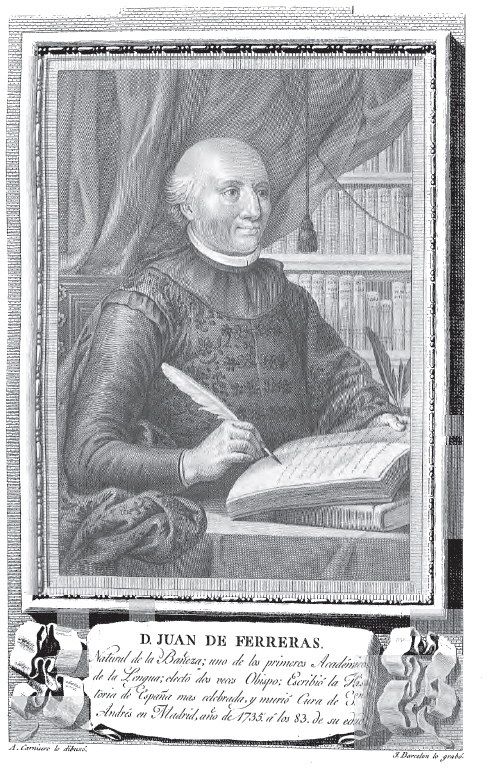
- Born: Juan de Ferreras y García; 1 June 1652; La Bañeza, Spain
- Died: 8 June 1735 (aged 83); Madrid, Spain

Seat B of the Real Academia Española
- In office 7 July 1713 – 8 June 1735
- Preceded by: Seat established
- Succeeded by: Jacinto de Mendoza

Juan de Ferreras y García (1 June 1652, La Bañeza – 8 June 1735) was a Spanish priest who became one of the founding members of the Royal Spanish Academy in 1713.

The Royal Library, opened to the intellectuals the by a decree of 1711, and had its real opening in 1712. The Royal Librarian Gabriel Álvarez de Toledo died soon after and there were pressures from the Jesuits to get Juan de Ferreras appointed as Royal Librarian. He coordinated the formal royal decrees on the Rules of Use of the Library in 1716, stating that the Director should be the Confessor of the King.

In 1717, as retribution for the Catalan support to the Habsburgs during the Spanish Succession War, Philip V of Spain closed all existing Catalan universities and unified them under the newly created University of Cervera. The new institution actively recruited many former professors of the Colegio de Cordelles and, as a result, ended up under the influence of Jesuits. The Seminario de Nobles of Madrid, created in 1727, was also strongly influenced by the Jesuits.
