= Eva Ment =

Wife of Dutch colonial governor (1606–1652)

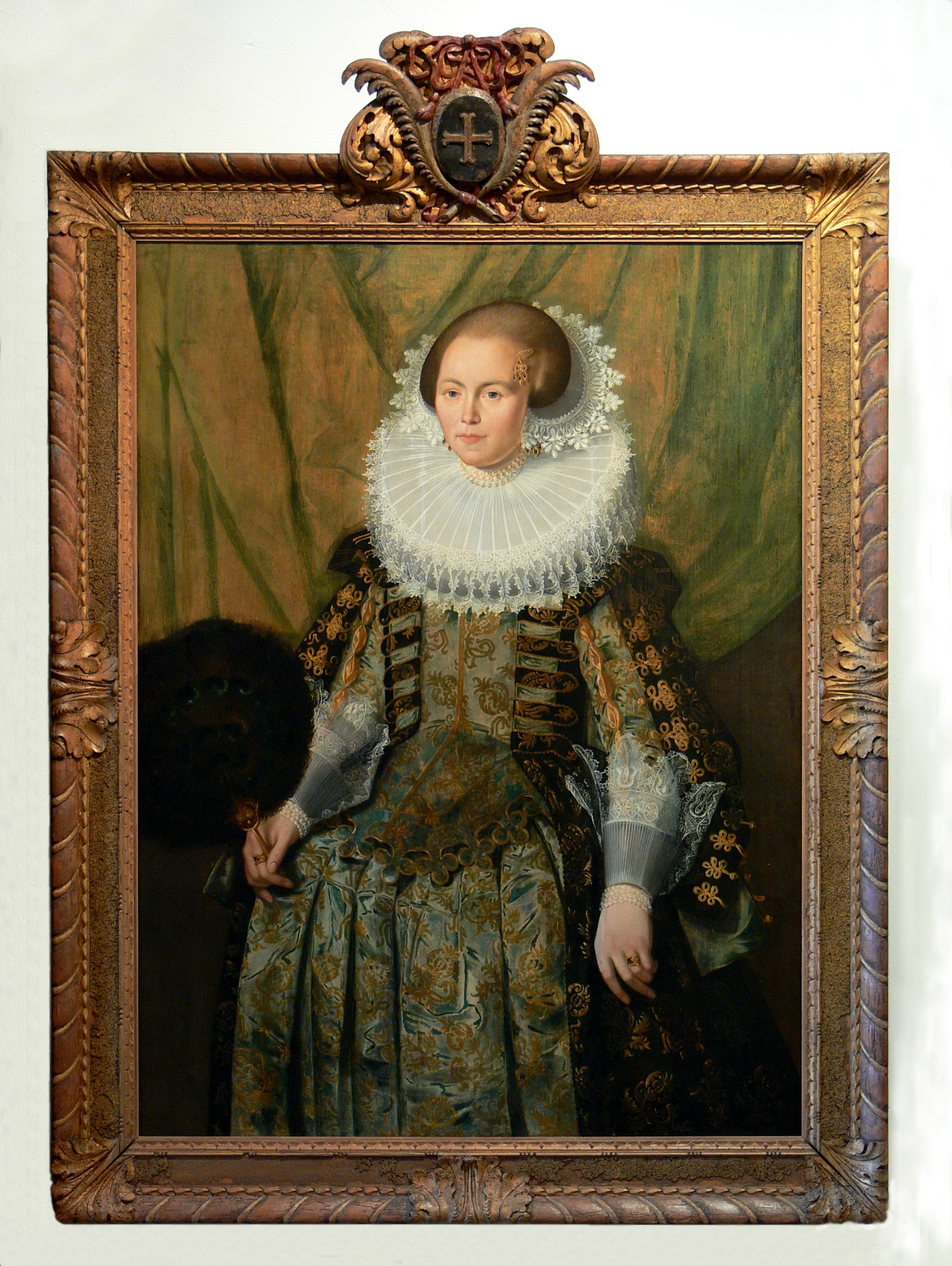
- Eva Ment
- Born: 1 January 1606; Amsterdam, Netherlands
- Died: 11 May 1652 (aged 46); Amsterdam, Netherlands
- Spouse(s): Jan Pieterszoon Coen (m. 1625; died 1629) Louwissen Marinus van Bergen (m. 1632; died 1645) Isaac Buys (m. 1646)
- Children: 7
- Parents: Claes Corneliszoon Ment (father); Sophia Benningh (mother)

Eva Ment (1 January 1606 - 11 May 1652), was a Dutch governor's wife.

She married in 1625, to the official Jan Pieterszoon Coen (1587-1629), governor general of Batavia, in 1632 to Louwissen Marinus van Bergen (1598-1645) and in 1646 to Isaac Buys (1618-1684).

== History ==
She was born to the brewer Claes Corneliszoon Ment and Sophia Benningh (1561-1627). She was raised in Amsterdam. When the former governor of Batavia Jan Pieterszoon Coen was due to return to the East Indies, he married her and took her with him on his return from the Netherlands. The purpose of the marriage was explicitly to make his wife a part of his policy to expand the Dutch colony of Batavia with the immigration of Dutch women to marry male colonists and both lay the foundation of a Dutch population there, as well as, implement a culturally Dutch society in the colony, with Dutch women who maintained Dutch customs in Batavia after the example of the governor's wife, who were to set example by using her position as the first lady of the colony as the leading missionary of Dutch civilization.

Eva Ment accompanied her spouse in company of her daughter, mother, sister and brother in 1627, and settled in Batavia. In Batavia, she set example for all following governor's wives by playing a role similar to a queen: she was provided official ladies-in-waiting and attended all official ceremonies of importance. Though her tenure as governor's wife was short, she made a great impact and was regarded as a role model for Dutch women in the colony, and the life of the Dutch women in Batavia were to become legendary in the 17th century for its luxurious and liberal lifestyle. She took her assignment as a social role model seriously and engaged heavily in societal issues: her most famous project was that she arranged for the upbringing of the illegitimate daughters of Dutch men and Asian women who were taken as foster daughters by the Dutch East India Company to become wives of the colonists (among them Sara Specx).

When she became a widow, she was asked by the Dutch East Indian company to remain and continue her work in the colony, but she declined the offer and returned to Amsterdam, where she remarried twice. In 1632, a new policy was introduced in Batavia: because Dutch women generally had too high demands on luxury and additionally often wished to return to the Netherlands rather than to settled permanently in the colony, which prevented real growth of the colonist population, female immigration to the Dutch East Indies was almost banned (with the exception of the wives and daughters of officials), a reform which was kept until 1869, and the male colonists were instead encouraged to free and marry their Asian slaves, who had lower demands on luxury and who did not wish to live in the Netherlands.
