= Battle of San Salvador (1642) =

Military assault

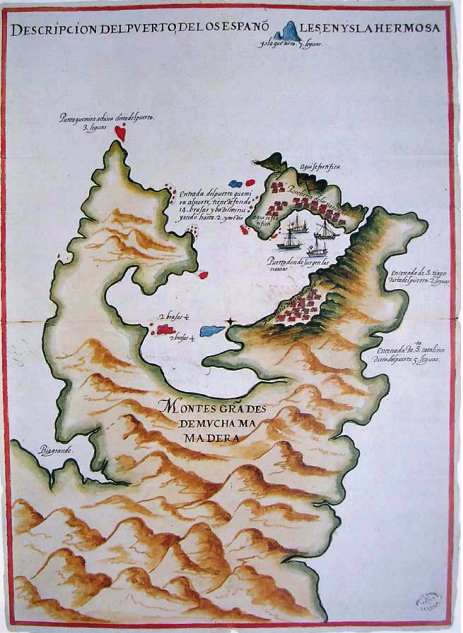
Date	19–26 August 1642
Location	Keelung, Taiwan 25°8′N 121°44′E
Result	Dutch victory
Territorial changes	Disestablishment of Spanish Formosa

Belligerents
Dutch Republic; Dutch Formosa	(Spain) Spanish Empire; Spanish East Indies; Spanish Formosa

Commanders and leaders
(Dutch Republic) Paulus Traudenius	(Spanish Empire) Gonzalo Portillo (surrendered)

Strength
Four large ships, several smaller ships, and 369 Dutch soldiers	60 Spanish and Filipino soldiers, and 30–40 aboriginal warriors
- Location within Taiwan

The Battle of San Salvador (1642), also known as the Second Battle of San Salvador, was a military assault launched by the Dutch on a small fortified Spanish settlement and its aboriginal allies in northern Formosa in 1642. After six days, the battle ended in defeat for the Spanish. The Spanish defeat secured complete island control for the Dutch.

== Background ==
Having lost the Battle of San Salvador the previous year, the Dutch amassed a more considerable force to drive the Spanish out of Formosa.

The Spanish, meanwhile, having lost the trust of the aboriginals during the previous battle, were low in morale and dispatched a letter to Manila to request reinforcements, but Governor-General Corcuera sent only two small vessels carrying twelve sailors and twenty soldiers, further lowering the morale of Spanish stationed in the fort.

== Siege ==
Location of Keelung, Taiwan

One evening in early August 1642, a sampan landed in front of the Spanish fort. Its passengers hurried ashore to deliver a letter to a Chinese man sojourning there. The letter said the Dutch had readied a large expedition against the Spanish fort. It advised the man to "go away at all events, since the enemy was coming, not as in the previous year, but with a much greater force; and therefore it seemed . . . that the Dutch would seize Keelung without fail." The Spanish prepared for a siege. Several days later, the Dutch arrived with four large ships, several smaller ones, and 369 Dutch soldiers.

Knowing that the Dutch would try to land a force on San Salvador to capture the hilltop positions, the Spanish attacked the Dutch landing party. Twelve Spanish soldiers, eight Pampangans, and thirty or forty aboriginal archers inflicted heavy damage on the landing soldiers, as "our men fired their guns at a crowd, and some used three balls at one shot; and the Indian bowmen, who were very skillful, also inflicted much damage on the Dutch, all the more as they came boldly on."

The Dutch, however, maintained their discipline and forced the small force to retreat. They climbed the hill and captured the Mira. Then they trained their gun on La Retirada. The Spanish soldiers who defended it were few and lacked supplies, but they fought hard because they knew that if the Dutch captured the redoubt, the Spanish were lost. But the Dutch were better equipped: "For every ten balls we shot," wrote one Spaniard later, "they responded with two hundred or more." Another wrote that the Dutch fired their guns "so incessantly that it seemed to be the Judgment Day; and they gave no respite to our men, who were few in number and worn out with fatigue." After four days of shooting, the Dutch battered the walls down and stormed the hill.

Having captured the redoubt, the Dutch aimed their cannon against the main fortress below and then sent a messenger with a white flag and a letter in Latin demanding surrender. The governor offered his surrender.

== Aftermath ==
After the surrender, the Dutch confiscated the Spanish arms and flags and ferried the Spanish troops first to Tayouan, then to Batavia, and finally back to Manila. The Dutch victory cemented their status as a rising power in Southeast Asia and curtailed further Spanish expansion. In the meantime, the Spanish quarreled about who deserved blame for the loss of Formosa. The Spanish governor, who had surrendered to the Dutch, was afraid he would be held responsible and refused to return to Manila. Corcuera received most of the blame and made powerful enemies in Manila. In 1644 Diego Fajardo Chacón, his successor as governor-general had him locked up to stand trial for the loss of Formosa. The prosecution charged that he had ordered the destruction of Fort Santo Domingo and the redoubt that protected San Salvador, that he had withdrawn three of the four companies of soldiers that defended the colony, and, finally, that he had installed as its last governor an inferior soldier who could neither read nor write. These actions were, the prosecution alleged, "the total cause of the loss of the Isla Hermosa." Corcuera spent five years imprisoned in the Philippines as the trial dragged on. "A strange turn of fortune!" wrote a contemporary. "Don Sebastian [Corcuera] had been the most absolute and the most dreaded lord in the world." Corcuera was freed by royal order. In 1651 he was named governor of Panama for a second time, but he declined. He did accept the post of governor and captain-general of the Canary Islands in 1659, serving there until his death the following year.

== See also ==
- Spanish Formosa
- Dutch Formosa
- Spanish East Indies
- Category:History of the Philippines (1565–1898), Spanish colonial period in the Philippines
