= Landdag =

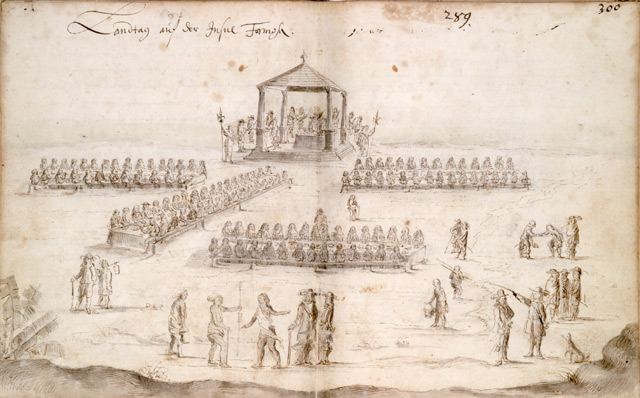
A Landdag meeting between the Dutch and Formosans

A Landdag (plural: Landdagen) was a political ceremony staged regularly by Dutch East India Company (VOC) authorities during the period of Dutch rule of Taiwan, known then as Formosa. This mass gathering of Dutch colonists and their aboriginal Formosan subjects was conceived as a device through which the Dutch, by means of a calculated display of power, prestige and paternal largesse, sought to cement their authority and the legitimacy of their rule over the native population. The Dutch word landdag (literally “country day” or "territorial assembly"), sometimes also called rijksdag on Dutch Formosa, is roughly equivalent to the English word diet.

== Origin ==
Although the first official Landdag was not held until 1641, the prototype for the event can be traced back to the peace ceremony of 1636 which was staged after the Dutch subjugation of the recalcitrant village of Mattau (modern Madou 麻豆) and its allies. This final victory over Mattau, made possible by the arrival of five hundred Dutch reinforcements from Batavia, served to avenge the slaying of 63 Dutch soldiers (a sizable contingent of the Dutch military presence at the time) committed by Mattau warriors a full six-and-a-half years before. As a symbol of their subjugation to Company rule, elders from Mattau presented the Dutch with betel-nut and coconut trees planted in the native soil of their village and humbly expressed regret for their past actions.

The defeat of Mattau, one of the most powerful villages in the region of South West Formosa where the Dutch had established themselves, led to a spate of peace overtures from other nearby villages. All in all some twenty aboriginal villages eventually surrendered their sovereignty to the Dutch by the end of 1636.

Robertus Junius, a Protestant missionary actively involved in the political affairs of the Dutch Colony, conceived of the staging of a great ceremony; 'in order to give the entry of the towns into Dutch sovereignty a more official status, and to bind these towns, which were usually at war with each other, to the [ ... ] Company and also to each other'. Governor Hans Putmans summoned representatives of each of the surrendered villages to the aboriginal village of Sinkan, the colonists’ oldest allies on Formosa. After they had gathered there, Putmans detailed their newfound duties as subjects of the Company and exhorted them to live together in a spirit of peace and friendship. More importantly, he selected two or three important men from each village and installed them as elders in their respective places, investing them with symbols of their authority: an orange flag, a black velvet robe and a staff bearing the VOC insignia in silver on its head. After a lavish feast the native participants returned to their villages and the Dutch to Fort Zeelandia.

The first official Landdag, held in 1641, followed the same basic outline as this first ceremony, albeit in larger and more sophisticated form. From 1644, two Landdagen were held on an annual basis, one Northern and one Southern for those villages to the North and South of the Dutch base at Tayouan (大員) respectively. As Dutch influence in Taiwan expanded, additional Landdagen were also held in the region of Tamsuy (modern Tamsui) in the area around modern Taipei and in Pimaba (modern Taitung) on the South-Eastern coast of Taiwan. However, since Dutch control in these areas was never firm, these Landdagen were held much more sporadically, a total of only six times each between the years of 1645 and 1657.

== Structure ==
In his thorough study of the institution of the Landdag, Tonio Andrade describes in detail the structure of the Landdag of March 1644, held in the village of Saccam (modern Tainan), and goes on to identify the typical sequence of events that Landdagen in general followed:

1. The Governor would arrive with his retinue, which included a ceremonial guard of halberdiers. His arrival would be accompanied by a great deal of fanfare, including the firing of cannons and musket salvoes.
2. If there was an execution to perform that year, this would then be carried out publicly.
3. Then came the seating of the aboriginal delegates and the Company employees in accordance with their rank. The Governor and his highest officials would be seated apart, usually beneath a ceremonial gazebo.
4. The Governor would then make a general address.
5. After the address came the transfer of authority, wherein authority was passed from old elders to new elders by the symbolic conferring of the ritual staves - in theory authority was meant to change hands on a regular basis; 'to allow each well-behaving person to enjoy the fruits of his good behaviour', however many local leaders retained their positions for many consecutive years. The Dutch themselves, while monopolizing the ultimate power to legitimate authority, had little say in the selection of local men for office, and were generally content to accept the candidates that the aborigines themselves put forward. In some sense the selection of elders served more symbolic and ideological, rather than pragmatic or political, ends.
6. At this point came the holding of court, wherein any cause for praise or demerit over the past year amongst those present were duly addressed, and specific disputes were settled where possible.
7. The Governor would make a second address.
8. The ceremony would invariably be capped off with a lavish feast, in which the Dutch and natives alike ate, drank and danced together, apparently in a spirit of general mirth and gaiety and festivities would continue well into the night. The Chinese would be excluded from these proceedings, but would, after the formal proceedings present themselves to Dutch officials and honour them with a Chinese banquet, in order to show to the natives their subservience to Company rule.

It was generally expected that all elders and native persons of note were to attend the Landdag, though for many, due to advanced age, difficult terrain, inclement weather or the just the sheer distance of travel, the burden was a heavy one, with many undertaking the journey at great personal risk.

== Aims ==
The defeat of the village of Mattau and its allies in 1636 was an unequivocal display of the superiority of Dutch arms in Taiwan, gaining the Company great prestige among the aboriginal villages who themselves placed great stock in martial prowess. Dutch military success also irrevocably shifted the delicate balance of power that had previously existed between the various native villages, and as more and more villages submitted to Dutch sovereignty (however loose in actual practice), the cost of staying antagonistic to the Dutch and the newly formed federation of “united villages” became increasingly untenable, and the tangible benefits harder to ignore.

Having gained so large a measure of prestige and power through force of arms, the Dutch now had the task of ‘converting […] military glory into political capital’ in order to create a stable and ideologically viable polity; to which end the Landdag was undoubtedly the most important tool in the Dutch arsenal. The ceremony itself was designed to display to an illiterate aboriginal audience the power of the Dutch, the charisma of the Governor and the benevolence of Dutch rule firstly through the use of military pageantry and the public execution of Dutch judicial authority on the one hand and by concerted displays of Dutch largesse on the other.

The Dutch used the occasion too to impress upon the aborigines a sense of shared destiny with each other and also with the Dutch regime, seeking to project an image of themselves as the beneficent guardians of the allied aborigines’ interests vis-à-vis the predations of other aboriginal towns and especially Chinese colonists. Because the Chinese themselves were responsible for most of the direct exploitation of aboriginal interests through the appropriation of aboriginal land for farming and the high intensity exploitation of native deer herds there was a great deal of anti-Chinese sentiment amongst the Formosan natives. Although the Dutch profited handsomely from Chinese enterprise, their use of the Chinese as a proxy for the extraction of native wealth nonetheless allowed them, somewhat cynically, to present themselves as the guardians of the aborigines and even make use of them in the control of Chinese colonists, aptly displayed in the suppression of a major Chinese uprising led by Guo Huaiyi in 1652 (Guo Huaiyi Rebellion 郭懷一事件), in which aboriginal warriors played a pivotal role.
