= Dutch Formosa =

Colony in Taiwan (1624–1662, 1664–1668)

Governorate of Formosa Gouvernement Formosa (Dutch) 荷屬福爾摩沙 (Chinese)
- 1624–1662
- Flag of the Dutch East India Company Emblem of the Dutch East India Company
- Anthem: "Wilhelmus van Nassouwe" (Dutch) "'William of Nassau"
- VOC holdings in green claims in light green

- The locations of Dutch Formosa, overlapping a map of the present-day island. Dutch Formosa Spanish Possessions Kingdom of Middag
- Status: Dutch colony
- Capital: Zeelandia (now Anping, Tainan)
- Official languages: Dutch
- Common languages: East Formosan languages • Hokkien
- Religion: Dutch Reformed, native animistic religion, Chinese folk religion
- Government: Governorate
- Governor
  - 1624–1625: Martinus Sonck
  - 1656–1662: Frederick Coyett
- Historical era: Age of Discovery
  - Established: 1624
  - Siege of Fort Zeelandia: 1661–1662
  - Disestablished: 1662
- Currency: Dutch guilder
Preceded by
| Prehistory of Taiwan |
| Kingdom of Middag |
| Spanish Formosa |
Succeeded by
| Kingdom of Tungning |
- Today part of: Republic of China (Taiwan)

The island of Taiwan, also commonly known as Formosa, was partly under colonial rule by the Dutch Republic from 1624 to 1662. In the context of the Age of Discovery, the Dutch East India Company established its presence on Formosa to trade with neighboring Ming China and Tokugawa Japan, and to interdict Portuguese and Spanish trade and colonial activities in East Asia.

The Dutch were not universally welcomed, and uprisings by both Taiwanese indigenous peoples and recent Han arrivals were quelled by the Dutch military on more than one occasion. With the rise of the Manchu-led Qing dynasty in the early 17th century, the Dutch East India Company cut ties with Ming China and allied with the Manchu Qing instead, in exchange for the right to unfettered access to their trade and shipping routes. The colonial period was brought to an end after the 1662 siege of Fort Zeelandia by Koxinga's army who promptly dismantled the Dutch colony, expelled the Dutch and established the Ming loyalist, anti-Qing Kingdom of Tungning.

== History ==
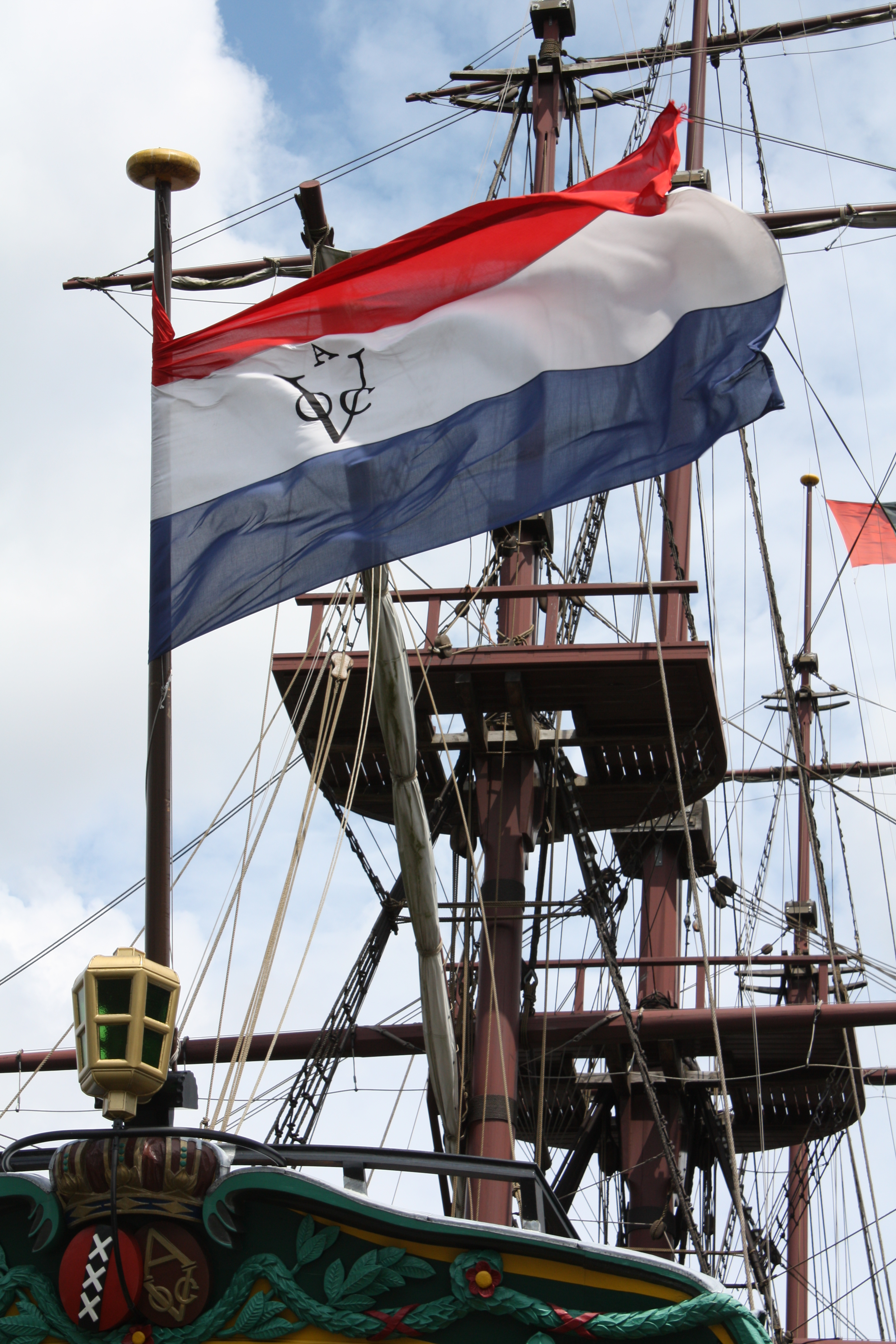
Replica of an East Indiaman of the Dutch East India Company/United East Indies Company (VOC).

=== Background ===
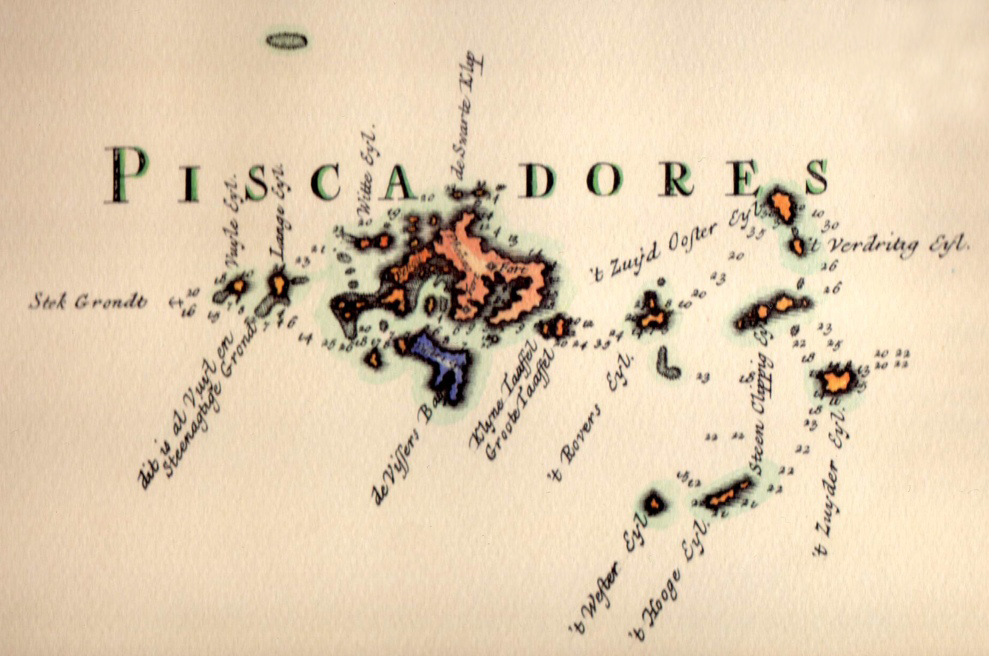
Dutch map of the Pescadores from circa 1726.

The Dutch Republic and England started expanding their colonial holdings and area of naval expeditions outside of Europe at the beginning of the 17th century, which inevitably brought conflict with the forces of Spain and Portugal. In addition to the commercial conflict, the Dutch (and English) had also broken with the Roman Catholic Church in the 16th century, unlike the staunchly-Catholic Iberian powers. The Dutch also fought Spain from the 1560s through the 1640s for formal recognition of their independence and the integrity of their territory in Europe.

The Dutch first attempted to trade with China in 1601 but were rebuffed by the Chinese authorities, who were already engaged in trade with the Portuguese at Macau from 1535.

In a 1604 expedition from Batavia (the central base of the Dutch in Asia), Admiral Wybrand van Warwijk set out to attack Macau, but his force was waylaid by a typhoon, driving them to the Pescadores (Penghu), a group of islands 30 miles (50 km) west of Formosa (Taiwan). Once there, the admiral attempted to negotiate trade terms with the Chinese on the mainland, but was asked to pay an exorbitant fee for the privilege of an interview. Surrounded by a vastly superior Chinese fleet, he left without achieving any of his aims.

The Dutch East India Company tried to use military force to make China open up a port in Fujian to trade and demanded that China expel the Portuguese, whom the Dutch were fighting in the Dutch–Portuguese War, from Macau. The Dutch raided Chinese shipping after 1618 and took junks hostage in an unsuccessful attempt to get China to meet their demands.

In 1622, after another unsuccessful Dutch attack on Macau (trade post of Portugal from 1557) and the failure to set up a trading post in Fat Tong O (present day Hong Kong), the fleet sailed to the Pescadores, this time intentionally, and proceeded to set up a base there at Makung to disrupt trade with Manila. They built a fort with forced labour recruited from the local Chinese population. Their oversight was reportedly so severe and rations so short that 1,300 of the 1,500 Chinese enslaved died in the process of construction.

The Dutch threatened Ming China with raids on Chinese ports and shipping unless the Chinese allowed trading on the Pescadores or Taiwan. They declared that merchants would be given Dutch passes for trips to Batavia and maybe Siam and Cambodia, but not to Manila, which would be subject to seizure by the Dutch. They demanded that the Ming open up ports in Fujian (Fukien) to Dutch trade, which the Chinese refused. The governor of Fujian, Shang Zhouzuo, proposed that the Dutch leave the Pescadores in favor of Formosa, where the Chinese would then authorize them to engage in trade. This led to a series of clashes between the Dutch and China from 1622 to 1624. After Shang's proposal on 19 September 1622, the Dutch raided Amoy in October and November. The Dutch intended to "induce the Chinese to trade by force or from fear." by raiding Fujian and Chinese shipping from the Pescadores. Long artillery batteries were erected at Amoy in March 1622 by Colonel Li-kung-hwa as a defence against the Dutch. Although the Dutch officers on site realized that the Ming would not be bullied into trading with them, the command in Batavia were slow to catch on, as they commanded repeated violence against the Chinese with whom they intended to trade.

On the Dutch attempt in 1623 to force China to open up a port, five Dutch ships were sent to Liu-ao and the mission ended in failure for the Dutch, with a number of Dutch sailors taken prisoner and one of their ships lost. In response to the Dutch using captured Chinese for forced labor and strengthening their garrison in the Pescadores with five more ships in addition to the six already there, the new governor of Fujian, Nan Juyi, was permitted by China to begin preparations to attack the Dutch forces in July 1623. A Dutch raid was defeated by the Chinese at Amoy in October 1623, with the Chinese taking the Dutch commander Christian Francs prisoner and burning one of the four Dutch ships. Yu Zigao began an offensive in February 1624 with warships and troops against the Dutch in the Pescadores with the intent of expelling them. The Chinese offensive reached the Dutch fort on 30 July 1624, with 5,000 Chinese troops (or 10,000) and 40-50 warships under Yu and General Wang Mengxiong surrounding the fort commanded by Marten Sonck, and the Dutch were forced to sue for peace on 3 August and folded before the Chinese demands, withdrawing from the Pescadores to Formosa. The Dutch admitted that their attempt at military force to coerce China into trading with them had failed with their defeat in the Pescadores. At the Chinese victory celebrations over the "red-haired barbarians," as the Dutch were called by the Chinese, Nan Juyi paraded twelve Dutch soldiers who were captured before the Emperor in Beijing. The Dutch were astonished that their violence did not intimidate the Chinese and at the subsequent Chinese attack on their fort in the Pescadores, since they thought them as timid and a "faint-hearted troupe," based on their experience with them in Southeast Asia.

=== Colonization ===
When the Dutch arrived in Taiwan, they found the southwest already frequented by a mostly transient Chinese population numbering close to 1,500. On deciding to set up in Taiwan and in common with standard practice at the time, the Dutch built a defensive fort to act as a base of operations. This was built on the sandy peninsula of Taoyuan (now part of mainland Taiwan, in current-day Anping District). This temporary fort was replaced four years later by the more substantial Fort Zeelandia. By 1626 there were 404 soldiers and 46 artillery specialists manning the fort. According to Salvador Diaz, a Portuguese man working with Chinese pirates to undermine the Dutch presence in favor of the Portuguese, there were only 320 Dutch soldiers and they were "short, miserable, and very dirty."

In 1624, the Dutch ship Golden Lion (Dutch: Gouden Leeuw) crashed into the coral reefs of Lamey and its crew was killed by the natives. In 1631, another ship wrecked on the reefs and its survivors were also killed by the inhabitants of Liuqiu Island. In 1633, an expedition consisting of 250 Dutch soldiers, 40 Chinese pirates, and 250 Taiwanese natives were sent against Liuqiu Island but met with little success.

The Dutch allied with Sinkan, a small village that provided them with firewood, venison and fish. In 1625, they bought a piece of land from the Sinkanders and built the town of Sakam for Dutch and Chinese merchants. Initially the other villages maintained peace with the Dutch but a series of events from 1625 to 1629 eroded this peace. In 1625, the Dutch attacked 170 Chinese pirates in Wankan but were driven off, damaging their reputation. Encouraged by the Dutch failure, Mattau warriors raided Sinkan, believing that the Dutch could not defend them. The Dutch returned with their ships and drove off the pirates later, restoring their reputation. Mattau was then forced to return the property stolen from Sinkan and make reparation. The people of Sinkan then attacked Mattau and Baccluan before seeking the Dutch for protection. Feeling that the Dutch could not sufficiently protect them, the people of Sinkan went to Japan for protection. In 1629, Pieter Nuyts visited Sinkan with 60 musketeers. After leaving the next morning, the musketeers were killed in an ambush by Mattau and Soulang warriors while crossing a stream. Nuyts avoided the ambush since he left the evening prior.

On 23 November 1629, an expedition set out and burned most of Baccluan, killing many of its people, who the Dutch believed harbored proponents of the previous massacre. Baccluan, Mattau, and Soulang people continued to harass company employees in the following years. This changed in late 1633 when Mattau and Soulang went to war with each other. Mattau won the fight but the Dutch were able to exploit the division.

In 1634, 475 Dutch soldiers from Batavia were sent as reinforcements and arrived at Taiwan in 1635. By this point even Sinkan was on bad terms with the Dutch. Soldiers were sent into the village and arrested those who plotted rebellion. In the winter of 1635 the Dutch defeated Mattau, who had been troubling them since 1623. Baccluan, north of the town of Sakam, was also defeated. In 1636, a large expedition was sent against Liuqiu Island. The Dutch and their allies chased about 300 inhabitants into caves, sealed the entrances, and killed them with poisonous fumes over eight days. The native population of 1100 was removed from the island. They were enslaved with the men sent to Batavia while the women and children became servants and wives for the Dutch officers. The Dutch planned to depopulate the outlying islands while working closely with allied natives. The villages of Taccariang, Soulang, and Tevorang were also pacified. In 1642, the Dutch massacred the people of Liuqiu island again.

Some Dutch missionaries were killed by Taiwanese indigenous peoples whom they had tried to convert: "The catechist, Daniel Hendrickx, whose name has been often mentioned, accompanied this expedition to the south, as his great knowledge of the Formosa language and his familiar intercourse with the natives, rendered his services very valuable. On reaching the island of Pangsuy, he ventured—perhaps with overweening confidence in himself— too far away from the others, and was suddenly surrounded by a great number of armed natives, who, after killing him, carried away in triumph his head, arms, legs, and other members, even his entrails, leaving the mutilated trunk behind."

=== Japanese trade ===
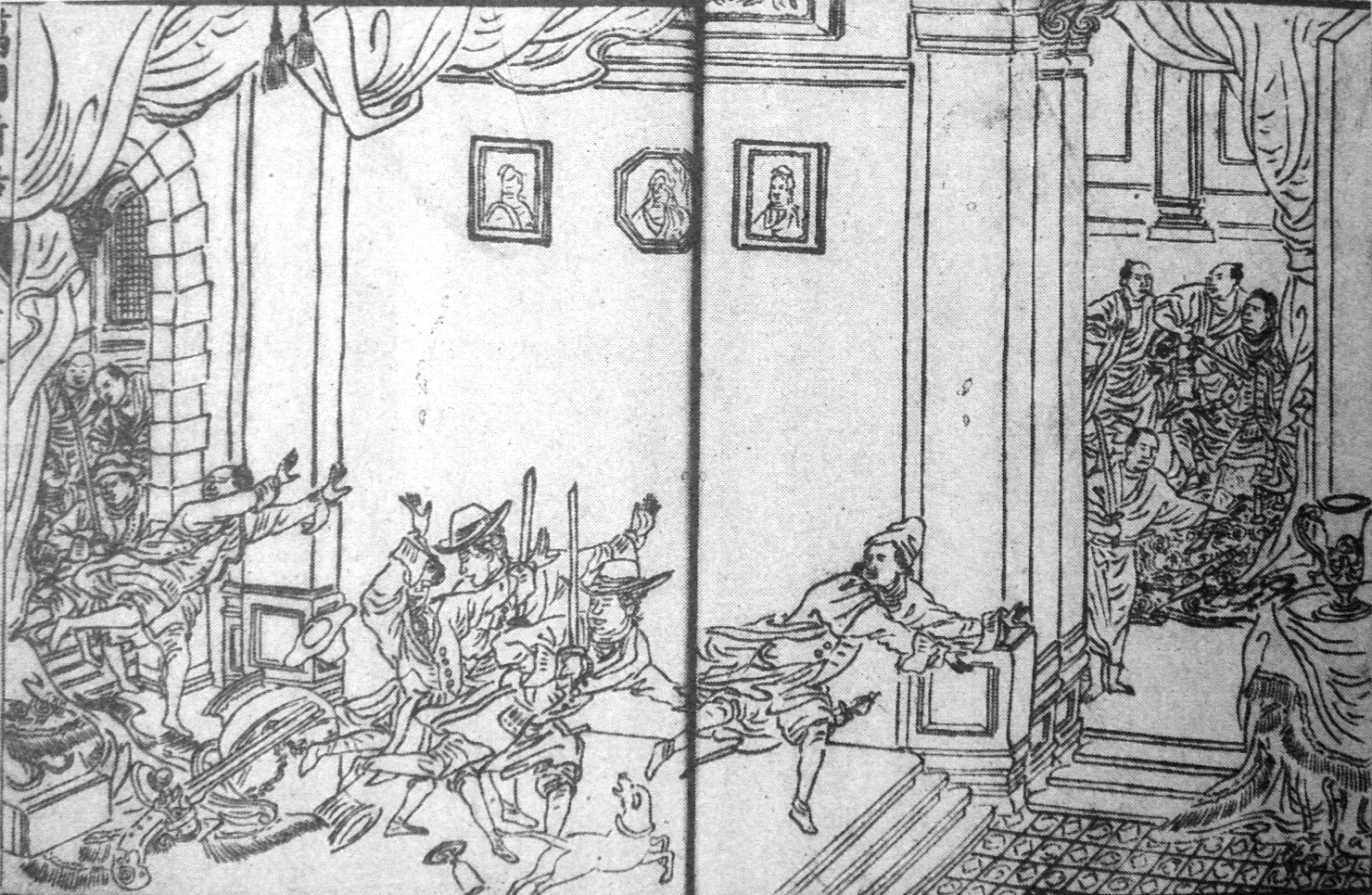
Capture of Pieter Nuyts

The Japanese had been trading for Chinese products in Taiwan since before the Dutch arrived in 1624. In 1593, Toyotomi Hideyoshi planned to incorporate Taiwan into his empire and sent an envoy with a letter demanding tribute. The letter was never delivered since there was no authority to receive it. In 1609, the Tokugawa shogunate sent Harunobu Arima on an exploratory mission of the island. In 1616, Nagasaki official Murayama Tōan sent 13 vessels to conquer Taiwan. The fleet was dispersed by a typhoon and the one junk that reached Taiwan was ambushed by headhunters, after which the expedition left and raided the Chinese coast instead.

In 1625, the Dutch government in Batavia ordered the governor of Taiwan to prevent the Japanese from trading. The Chinese silk merchants refused to sell to the company because the Japanese paid more. The Dutch also restricted Japanese trade with the Ming dynasty. In response, the Japanese took on board 16 inhabitants from the aboriginal village of Sinkan and returned to Japan. Suetsugu Heizō Masanao housed the Sinkanders in Nagasaki. Batavia sent a man named Peter Nuyts to Japan where he learned about the Sinkanders. The shogun declined to meet the Dutch and gave the Sinkanders gifts. Nuyts arrived in Taiwan before the Sinkanders and refused to allow them to land before the Sinkanders were jailed and their gifts confiscated. The Japanese took Nuyts hostage and only released him in return for their safe passage back to Japan with 200 picols of silk as well as the Sinkanders' freedom and the return of their gifts. The Dutch blamed the Chinese for instigating the Sinkanders.

The Dutch dispatched a ship to repair relations with Japan but it was seized and its crew imprisoned upon arrival. The loss of the Japanese trade made the Taiwanese colony far less profitable and the authorities in Batavia considered abandoning it before the Council of Formosa urged them to keep it unless they wanted the Portuguese and Spanish to take over. In June 1630, Suetsugu died and his son, Masafusa, allowed the company officials to reestablish communication with the shogun. Nuyts was sent to Japan as a prisoner and remained there until 1636 when he returned to the Netherlands. After 1635, the shogun forbade Japanese from going abroad and eliminated the Japanese threat to the company. The VOC expanded into previous Japanese markets in Southeast Asia. In 1639, the shogun ended all contact with the Portuguese, the company's major silver trade competitor.

=== Piracy (1620s-1630s) ===
The Europeans worked with and also fought against Chinese pirates. The pirate Li Dan was the mediator between Ming Chinese forces and the Dutch at Penghu. In 1625, VOC officials learned that he had kept gifts they had entrusted him with giving to Chinese officials. His men also tried pillaging junks on their way to trade in Taiwan. One Salvador Diaz acted as the pirates' informant and gave them inside information on where junks leaving Tayouan could be captured. Diaz collected protection money as well. A Chinese merchant named Xu Xinsu complained to Dutch officials that he was forced to pay 2,000 taels to Diaz. Li Dan's son, Li Guozhu, also collected collection money, known as "water taxes". Chinese fishermen paid 10 percent of their catch for a document guaranteeing their safety from pirates. This caused the VOC to also enter the protection business. They sent three junks to patrol a fishing fleet charging the same fee as the pirates, 10 percent of the catch. This was one of the first taxes the company levied on the colony.

In July 1626, the Council of Formosa ordered all Chinese individuals living or trading in Taiwan to obtain a license to "distinguish the pirates from the traders and workers". This residence permit eventually became a head tax and major source of income for the Dutch.

After Li Dan died in 1625, Zheng Zhilong became the new pirate chief. The Dutch allowed him to pillage under their flag. In 1626, he sold a large junk to the company, and on another occasion he delivered nine captured junks as well as their cargos worth more than 20,000 taels. Chinese officials asked the Dutch for help against Zheng in return for trading rights. Company officials were told that if they refused their help, their main Chinese trading partner, Xu Xinsu, would no longer be permitted to trade with the company but would instead "be destroyed along with his entire family." The company agreed and the Dutch lieutenant governor visited the officials in Fujian to inform them that the Dutch would drive Zheng from the coast. However, the Dutch were too late, and Zheng attacked the city of Xiamen, destroying hundreds of junks and setting fire to buildings and houses. Considering Zheng too strong to fight, in 1628 the Chinese authorities awarded him with an official title and imperial rank to appease him. Zheng became the "Patrolling Admiral" responsible for clearing the coast of pirates. He used his official position to destroy his competitors and established himself in the port of Yuegang. In October 1628, Zheng agreed to supply silks, sugar, ginger, and other goods to the company in return for silver and spices at a fixed rate. Then the Dutch got angry at Zheng, who they were convinced was trying to monopolize trade to Taiwan. His promise "disappeared into smoke". In the summer of 1633, a Dutch fleet and the pirate Liu Xiang carried out a successful sneak attack on Zheng's fleet. Zheng believed that he and the Dutch were on good terms and was caught off guard; his fleet was destroyed.

Zheng immediately began preparing a new fleet. On 22 October 1633, the Zheng forces lured the Dutch fleet and their pirate allies into an ambush and defeated them. The Dutch reconciled with Zheng, who offered them favorable terms, and he arranged for more Chinese trade in Taiwan. The Dutch believed this was because of Chinese fears of piracy. The pirate Liu Xiang still fought against Zheng, and when the Dutch refused to help him, Liu captured a Dutch junk and used its 30-man crew as human shields. Liu attacked Fort Zeelandia but some Chinese residents warned the company and they fought off the pirates without any trouble. In 1637, Liu was defeated by Zheng, who established primacy over the Fujianese trading world. He continued to have a hand in the affairs of Taiwan and aided the growth of the Chinese population there. He made plans with a Chinese official to relocate drought victims to Taiwan and to provide each person three silver taels and an ox for every three people. The plan was never carried out.

=== Pax Hollandica and the ousting of the Spanish (1636–1642) ===
Following the pacification campaigns of 1635–1636, more and more villages came to the Dutch to swear allegiance, sometimes out of fear of Dutch military action, and sometimes for the benefits which Dutch protection could bring (food and security). These villages stretched from Longkiau in the south (125 km from the Dutch base at Fort Zeelandia) to Favorlang in central Taiwan, 90 km to the north of Fort Zeelandia. The relative calm of this period has been called the Pax Hollandica (Dutch Peace) by some commentators (a reference to the Pax Romana).

One area not under their control was the north of the island, which from 1626 had been under Spanish sway, with their two settlements at Tamsui and Keelung. The fortification at Keelung was abandoned because the Spanish lacked the resources to maintain it, but Fort Santo Domingo in Tamsui was seen as a major obstacle to Dutch ambitions on the island and the region in general.

After failing to drive out the Spanish in 1641, the Dutch returned in 1642 with reinforcements of Dutch soldiers and aboriginal warriors in ships, managing to dislodge the small Spanish-Filipino contingent from their fortress and drive them from the island. Following this victory, the Dutch set about bringing the northern villages under their banner in a similar way to the pacification campaign carried out in the previous decade in the south.

=== Guo Huaiyi rebellion (1652) ===
In 1644 a Manchu army entered Beijing, setting off nearly forty years of civil war in China. This greatly upset the profitable silk trade between China, Formosa and Japan, causing the Dutch to implement new taxes in order to recoup lost profits. Some of the tolls were to be collected by the same people that helped establish the colony; Chinese entrepreneurs, to whom the Dutch sold the rights to collect certain taxes. An exception to this was hoofdgeld, a residency tax of a quarter real for the Chinese settlers, now estimated at 10% of a laborer's monthly take-home pay. Despite this being lower than the traditional Chinese tax rate of 12%, other conditions on the frontier might have made the burden unbearable for some. The residency tax also came with a residency permit called hoofdbrief, which the Chinese were required to hold and show to any Dutchman who asked. This system was widely abused by company soldiers, demanding to see documents as an excuse to extort money. The governor-general in Batavia himself wrote a letter to Taiwan about the issue, saying: "It is no good policy to treat so badly [China], which has come over to us through lack of a better alternative." Despite some efforts to mitigate the hoofdbrief abuse, tensions continued to rise.

In 1644, a pirate named Kinwang who had been sacking aboriginal villages in Formosa since the previous year, stranded in the Bay of Lonkjauw and the natives captured him, handing him over to the Dutch. Kinwang had proclaimed his rule over the northern parts of the island, as an opposing force to the Dutch in the south. After his capture he was executed, and a document in his possession was found appealing to the Chinese of Formosa, promising to pay them richly and capitalizing on frustrations of Dutch taxes and their restrictions on trading and hunting. The document said the pirates would protect them and kill any natives who sought to harm them.

The Dutch began to encourage large-scale Han immigration to the island, mainly from the south of Fujian. Most of the immigrants were young single males who were discouraged from staying on the island, often referred to by Han as "The Gate of Hell" for its reputation in taking the lives of sailors and explorers. After one uprising by Hanin 1640, the Guo Huaiyi rebellion in 1652 saw an organised insurrection against the Dutch, fuelled by anger over punitive taxes and corrupt officials. The Dutch again put down the revolt hard, with fully 25% of those participating in the rebellion being killed over a period of a couple of weeks.

On 7 September 1652, it was reported that a Chinese farmer, Guo Huaiyi, had gathered an army of peasants armed with bamboo spears and harvest knives to attack Sakam. They attacked the next morning. Most of the Dutch were able to find refuge in the company's horse stables but others were captured and executed. A company of 120 Dutch soldiers shot at a peasant army 4,000 strong and scattered them. The Dutch told the natives that they would be rewarded with Indian textiles if they helped fight the Chinese. Over the next two days, native warriors and Dutch warriors killed around 500 Chinese, most of whom were hiding in the sugarcane fields. On 11 September, four or five thousand Chinese rebels clashed with the company soldiers and their native allies. After suffering two thousand casualties, the rebels fled south, only to be killed by a large force of natives. In total some 4,000 Chinese were killed and Guo Huaiyi's head was displayed on a stake.

Although easily put down, the rebellion and its ensuing massacre of Chinese destroyed the rural labor force since most of the rebels were farmers. Although the crops were fairly unharmed, the company could not obtain the required labor to harvest them, resulting in a below average harvest for 1653. However, thousands of Chinese migrated to Taiwan due to war on the mainland and a modest recovery of agriculture occurred the next year. Measures were taken to suppress the Chinese and anti-Chinese rhetoric increased. Natives were reminded to keep an eye on the Chinese and not to engage in unnecessary contact with them. The Dutch portrayed themselves as protectors of aboriginal land against Chinese encroachment. In terms of military preparations, little was done except to build a small thinly walled fort. The Dutch did not feel threatened because most of the rebels were agriculturalists while the rich Chinese had sided with the Dutch and warned them of the rebellion.

In May 1654, Fort Zeelandia was afflicted by a swarm of locusts, then a plague that killed thousands of natives, Dutch, and Chinese, and then an earthquake that destroyed homes and buildings with aftershocks lasting seven weeks.

=== Indigenous rebellions in other areas of Taiwan (1650s) ===
Multiple indigenous villages rebelled against the Dutch in the 1650s because of oppression, such as when the Dutch ordered indigenous women for sex, deer pelts, and rice be given to them from indigenous in the Taipei basin in Wu-lao-wan village, which sparked a rebellion in December 1652 at the same time as the Chinese rebellion. Two Dutch translators were beheaded by the Wu-lao-wan indigenous, and in a subsequent fight 30 indigenous and another two Dutch people died. After an embargo of salt and iron on Wu-lao-wan, the indigenous were forced to sue for peace in February 1653.

=== Trade war (1650s) ===
Zheng Chenggong, known in Dutch sources as Koxinga, was born in Hirado, Japan to the Fujianese pirate Zheng Zhilong and his Japanese wife. By 1640, Zhilong had become military commander of Fujian Province. Chenggong spent the first seven years of his life in Japan with his mother Tagawa Matsu and then went to school in Fujian, obtaining a county-level licentiate at the age of 15. Afterwards he studied at the Imperial Academy in Nanjing. When Beijing fell in 1644 to rebels, Chenggong and his followers declared their loyalty to the Ming dynasty and he was bestowed the title Koxinga (Chinese: 國姓爺; Pe̍h-ōe-jī: Kok-sèng-iâ; lit. 'Lord of the Imperial surname'). His father Zhilong aided the Longwu Emperor in a military expedition in 1646, but Longwu was captured and executed. In November 1646, Zhilong declared his loyalty to the Qing. Chenggong continued the resistance against the Qing from Xiamen. In 1649, Chenggong gained control over Quanzhou but then lost it. In 1650 he planned a major offensive from Guangdong in conjunction with a Ming loyalist in Guangxi. The Qing deployed a large army to the area and Chenggong decided to ferry his army along the coast but a storm hindered his movements. The Qing launched a surprise attack on Xiamen, forcing him to return to protect it. From 1656 to 1658 he planned to take Nanjing. In the summer of 1658 he set sail but a storm turned him back. On July 7, 1659, Chenggong's fleet set sail again and his army encircled Nanjing on 24 August. Qing reinforcements arrived and broke Chenggong's army, forcing them to retreat to Xiamen. In 1660 the Qing embarked on a coastal evacuation policy to starve Chenggong of his source of livelihood.

Some of the rebels during the Guo Huaiyi rebellion had expected aid from Chenggong and some company officials believed that the rebellion had been incited by him. A Jesuit priest told the Dutch that Chenggong was looking at Taiwan as a new base of operations. In the spring of 1655 no silk junks arrived in Taiwan. Some company officials suspected that this was a plan by Chenggong to harm them. The company sent a junk to Penghu to see whether Chenggong was preparing forces there but they found nothing. In 1655, the governor of Taiwan received a letter from Chenggong insulting the Dutch and referring to the Chinese in Taiwan as his subjects. He commanded them to stop trading with the Spanish. Chenggong directly addressed the Chinese leaders in Taiwan rather than Dutch authorities, stating that he would withhold his junks from trading in Taiwan if the Dutch would not guarantee his junks safety from Dutch depredations in Southeast Asia. Chenggong had increased foreign trade by sending junks to various regions and Batavia was wary of this competition. Batavia sent a small fleet to Southeast Asian ports to intercept Chenggong's junks. One junk was captured but another junk managed to escape.

The Taiwanese trade slowed and for several months in late 1655 and early 1656 not a single Chinese vessel arrived in Tayouan. Even low-cost goods grew scarce and the value of aboriginal products fell. The system of selling Chinese merchants the right to trade in aboriginal villages fell apart as did many other revenue generating system. On 9 July 1656, a junk flying Chenggong's flag arrived at Fort Zeelandia. Chenggong wrote that he was angry with the Dutch but since Chinese people lived in Taiwan, he would allow them to trade on the Chinese coast for 100 days so long as only Taiwanese products were sold. Chinese merchants began leaving with their families. Chenggong made good on his edict and confiscated a Chinese junk from Tayouan trading pepper in Xiamen, causing Chinese merchants to abort their trade voyages. A Chinese official arrived in Tayouan carrying a document with Chenggong's seal demanding to inspect all the junks in Tayouan and their cargoes. Chinese merchants refused to buy the company's foreign wares and even sold their own foreign wares, causing prices to collapse.

Chinese merchants in indigenous villages ran out of goods to trade for aboriginal products. Chinese farmers also suffered due to the exodus of Chinese. They could not export their rice and sugar and their investments in fields and labor wasted away. By the end of 1656, Chinese farmers were asking for relief from debts and even requested help in the form of guaranteed prices. Many Chinese could barely find food for themselves. The Chinese sent presents and a letter to Chenggong urging him to reopen trade to Taiwan but no reply was received. The Dutch also sent letters to Chenggong through a Chinese intermediary named He Tingbin.

=== Siege of Zeelandia and the end of Dutch government on Formosa (1660–1662) ===
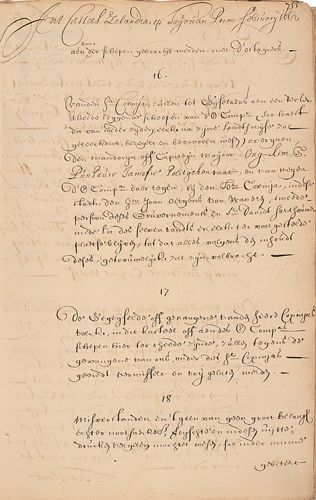
Peace Treaty of 1662, between Governor Coyett and Koxinga

A VOC employee, He Bin, fled to Zheng Chenggong and provided him with a map of Taiwan. On 23 March 1661, Zheng's fleet set sail from Kinmen with a fleet carrying around 25,000 soldiers and sailors. The fleet arrived at Tayouan on 2 April. Zheng's forces routed 240 Dutch soldiers at Baxemboy Island in the Bay of Taiwan and landed at the bay of Luermen. Three Dutch ships attacked the Chinese junks and destroyed several until their main warship exploded. The remaining ships were unable to keep Zheng from controlling the waters around Taiwan.

On 4 April, Fort Provintia surrendered to Zheng forces. On 7 April, Zheng's army besieged Fort Zeelandia. An assault on the fort failed and many of Zheng's best soldiers died, after which Zheng decided to starve out the defenders. The company dispatched a fleet of 12 ships and 700 sailors to relieve the fort. The reinforcements met with bad weather and a shipwreck that had an entire crew captured by natives and sent to the Zheng camp. Fighting lasted from July to October when the Dutch ultimately failed to relieve the siege after losing several ships and retreated. In January 1662, a sergeant named Hans Jurgen Radis defected and informed the Zheng forces of a weakness in the defenses. On 12 January, Zheng's ships initiated a bombardment and the Dutch surrendered. On 9 February the remaining company personnel in Fort Zeelandia left Taiwan. The Dutch held out at Keelung until 1668 when they withdrew from Taiwan completely.

=== Retaking of Keelung (1664–1668) and further hostilities ===
After being ousted from Taiwan, the Dutch allied with the new Qing dynasty in China against the Zheng regime in Taiwan. Following some skirmishes the Dutch retook the northern fortress at Keelung in 1664. Zheng Jing sent troops to dislodge the Dutch, but they were unsuccessful. The Dutch held out at Keelung until 1668, when aborigine resistance (likely incited by Zheng Jing), and the lack of progress in retaking any other parts of the island persuaded the colonial authorities to abandon this final stronghold and withdraw from Taiwan altogether.

Keelung was a lucrative possession for the Dutch East India Company with 26% of the company's profits coming from their Taiwan operations in 1664.

Qing-Dutch forces attempted to invade Taiwan twice in December 1664. On both occasions Admiral Shi Lang turned back his ships due to adverse weather. Shi Lang tried to attack Taiwan again in 1666 but turned back due to a storm. The Dutch continued to attack Zheng ships from time to time, disrupting trade, and occupied Keelung until 1668, but they were unable to take back the island. On 10 September 1670, a representative from the English East India Company (EIC) signed a trade agreement with the Zheng regime. Despite this, trade with the EIC was limited due to the Zheng monopoly on sugarcane and deer hide as well as the inability of the English to match the price of East Asian goods for resale. Zheng trade was subject to the Qing sea ban policy throughout its existence, limiting trade with mainland China to smugglers.

The Dutch looted relics and killed monks after attacking a Buddhist complex at Putuoshan on the Zhoushan islands in 1665.

In 1672, off northeastern Taiwan, Zheng Jing's ships captured, looted, and sank the Dutch fluyt Cuylenburg, bound from Nagasaki to Batavia. Zheng's men executed 34 Dutch sailors and drowned eight others. Only 21 Dutch sailors escaped to Japan.

== Government ==
The Prinsenvlag displayed by subject villages

The Dutch claimed the entirety of the island, but because of the inaccessibility of the central mountain range the extent of their control was limited to the plains on the west coast, plus isolated pockets on the east coast. This territory was acquired from 1624 to 1642, with most of the villages being required to swear allegiance to the Dutch and then largely being left to govern themselves.

The manner of acknowledging Dutch lordship was to bring a small native plant (often betel nut or coconut) planted in earth from that particular town to the governor, signifying the granting of the land to the Dutch. The governor would then award the village leader a robe and a staff as symbols of office and a Prinsenvlag ("Prince's Flag", the flag of William the Silent) to display in their village.

=== Governor of Formosa ===
The governor of Formosa (Dutch: gouverneur van Formosa; Chinese: 台灣長官) was the head of government. Appointed by the governor-general of the Dutch East Indies in Batavia (modern-day Jakarta, Indonesia), the governor of Formosa was empowered to legislate, collect taxes, wage war and declare peace on behalf of the Dutch East India Company (VOC) and therefore by extension the Dutch state.

He was assisted in his duties by the Council of Tayouan, a group made up of the various worthies in residence in Tayouan. The president of this council was the second-in-command to the governor, and would take over his duties if the governor died or was incapacitated. The governor's residence was in Fort Zeelandia on Tayouan (then an island, now the Anping District of Tainan City). There were a total of twelve governors during the Dutch colonial era.

== Economy ==
The Tayouan factory (as VOC trading posts were called) was to become the second-most profitable factory in the whole of the Dutch East Indies (after the post at Hirado/Dejima), although it took 22 years for the colony to first return a profit. Benefitting from triangular trade between themselves, the Chinese and the Japanese, plus exploiting the natural resources of Formosa, the Dutch were able to turn the malarial sub-tropical bay into a lucrative asset. A cash economy was introduced (using the Spanish real, which was used by the VOC) and the period also saw the first serious attempts in the island's history to develop it economically.

=== Trade ===
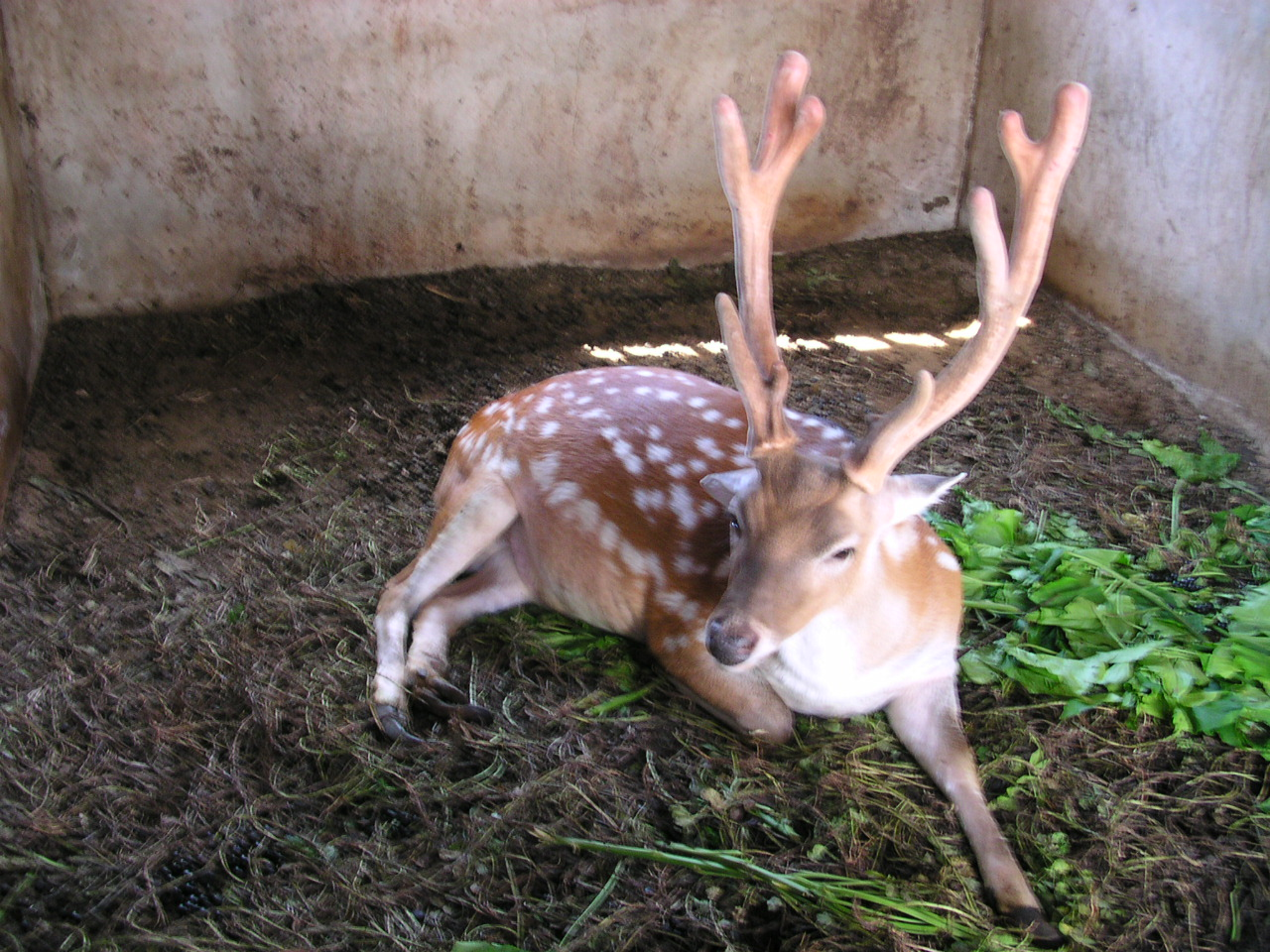
Formosan sika deer

The original intention of setting up Fort Zeelandia at Tayowan (Anping) in southern Formosa was to provide a base for trading with China and Japan, as well as interfering with Portuguese and Spanish trade in the region. Goods traded included silks from China and silver from Japan, among many other things.

After establishing their fortress, the Dutch realised the potential of the vast herds of the native Formosan sika deer (Cervus nippon taioanus) roaming the western plains of the island. The tough deer skins were highly prized by the Japanese, who used them to make samurai armour. Other parts of the deer were sold to Chinese traders for meat and medical use. The Dutch paid indigenous peoples for the deer brought to them and tried to manage the deer stocks to keep up with demand. Unfortunately the deer the indigenous peoples had relied on for their livelihoods began to disappear, forcing the indigenous to adopt new means of survival. However, the subspecies was kept alive in captivity and subsequent reintroduction of the subspecies into the wild has been successful. In 1638, the Dutch exported 151,400 deer hides from Taiwan to Japan. Although the number of deer hides exported to Japan dropped due to the decreased deer population, the considerable number of deer hides ranged from 50,000 to 80,000 was still exported. Tea was also a major export item. After Chinese people settled in Taiwan, they started to grow tea on less fertile hillsides where rice could not be cultivated.

Although sugarcane was a native crop of Taiwan, the indigenous people had never been able to make sugar granules from the raw sugar. It was the Ming and Qing Chinese immigrants who introduced the technique to turn raw sugarcane into sugar granules to the region. Sugar became the most important export commodity in Formosa, and the main purpose of growing it was to export it. The sugar produced in Taiwan made far higher profit than the sugar produced in Java. In 1645, 300,000 catties of sugar, which was one third of the total production, were carried to Persia. In 1658, Taiwan produced 1,730,000 catties of sugar, and 800,000 catties (45%) were shipped to Persia, with 600,000 (35%) exported to Japan. The rest was exported to the Netherlands. Tea was also a major export item. Another one of Taiwan's major export items was sulfur collected from near Keelung and Tamsui.

Taiwan, especially Taoyuan, became an important transshipment center for East Asian trade networks. The products from Japan, Fukienn, Vietnam, Thailand, and Indonesia were shipped to Taiwan, and then exported to other countries as the markets demanded. The Dutch exported amber, spices, pepper, lead, tin, hemp, cotton, opium and kapok from Southeast Asia through Batavia to China by way of Taiwan and carried silk, porcelain, gold, and herbs from China to Japan and Europe via Taiwan.

=== Agriculture ===
The Dutch also employed Chinese to farm sugarcane and rice for export; some of this rice and sugar was exported as far as the markets of Persia. Attempts to persuade aboriginal tribesmen to give up hunting and adopt a sedentary farming lifestyle were unsuccessful because "for them, farming had two major drawbacks: first, according to the traditional sexual division of labor, it was women's work; second, it was labor-intensive drudgery."

The Dutch therefore imported labour from China, and the era was the first to see mass Chinese immigration to the island, with one commentator estimating that 50–60,000 Chinese settled in Taiwan during the 38 years of Dutch rule. These settlers were encouraged with free transportation to the island, often on Dutch ships, and tools, oxen and seed to start farming. In return, the Dutch took a tenth of agricultural production as a tax.

=== Taxation ===
After the Dutch took control over Taiwan, they immediately levied a tax on all the import and export duties. Although the rates of such taxation are unknown as there are no records, the Dutch must have made a lot of profit from the export duties received by Chinese and Japanese traders. This resulted in the friction between the Dutch and the Japanese causing the Hamada Yahei incident in 1628.

Another form of taxation was the poll tax which the Dutch levied on every person who was not Dutch and above six years of age. At first, the rate of the poll tax was set at a quarter of a real whereas the Dutch, later on, increased the rate to a half real. In 1644, the total amount of the poll tax imposed was 33,7000 reals and in 1644, over 70,000 reals were imposed. Coupled with restrictive land tenancy policies and extortion by Dutch soldiers, the tax provided grounds for the major insurrections of 1640 and 1652.

The Dutch imposed a tax on hunting as well. They sold a license to dig a pit-trap for 15 reals a month and a license for snaring was sold for one real. During the hunting season between October 1638 and March 1639, the total amount of the hunt tax was 1,998.5 reals. There were no licenses for fishing while it was taxed.

By 1653, the Dutch revenue from Taiwan was estimated at 667,701 gulden 3 stuiver and 12 penning, including the revenue of 381,930 from tradings. This indicates that for Dutch, taxation became the important way of making profit in Taiwan.

== Demographics ==
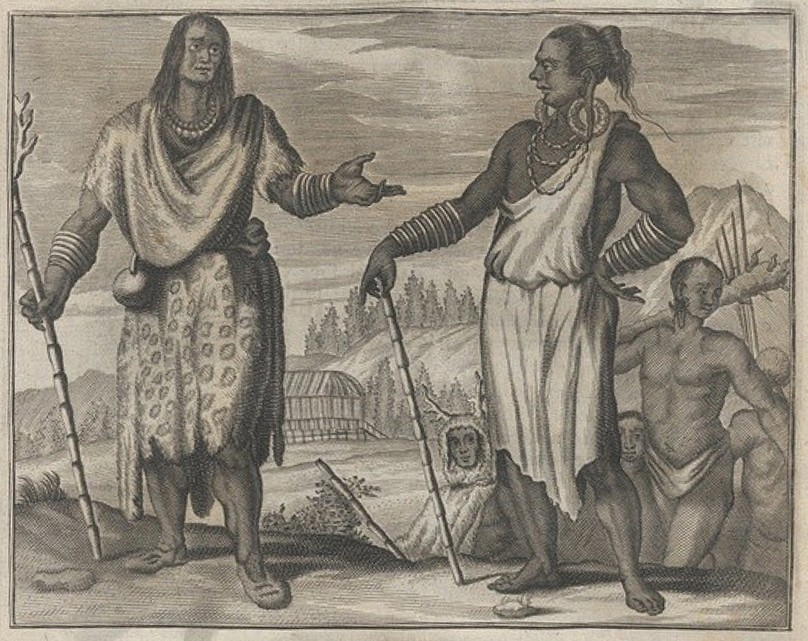
Taiwanese aborigines, from Olfert Dapper (1670): Gedenkwaerdig bedryf

Prior to the arrival of the Dutch, Taiwan was almost exclusively populated by Taiwanese aborigines; Austronesian peoples who lived in a hunter-gatherer society while also practicing swidden agriculture. It is difficult to arrive at an estimate of the numbers of these native Formosans when the Dutch arrived, as there was no island-wide authority in a position to count the population, while the aborigines themselves did not keep written records. Even at the extent of greatest Dutch control in the 1650s there were still large regions of the island outside the pale of Dutch authority, meaning that any statistics given necessarily relate only to the area of Dutch sovereignty.

=== Ethnicity ===
The population of Dutch Formosa was composed of three main groups; the aborigines, the Dutch contingent, and the Chinese. There were also a number of Spanish people resident in the north of the island between 1626 and 1642 in the area around Keelung and Tamsui. At times there were also a handful of Japanese-Korean trader-pirates known as Wakō operating out of coastal areas outside Dutch control.

==== Indigenous peoples ====
The native Formosan peoples had been in Taiwan for thousands of years before the Dutch arrived. The first census of the island, conducted by the Dutch in 1650 as they sought control of the entire island, estimated the indigenous peoples as numbering between 64,000 and 68,000 and comprising the island's ethnic majority. They lived in villages with populations ranging from a couple of hundred up to around 2,000 people for the biggest towns, with different groups speaking different Formosan languages which were not mutually intelligible.

Captain Ripon was a French-speaking Swiss soldier from Lausanne. He was sent to Taiwan in 1623 to construct a fortress on the island. Shortly after finishing the fortress, Ripon was ordered to destroy the fortress and leave Taiwan. He wrote an account of his experiences.

Ripon's diary describes how he was sent to Tayouan where a small fortress was built. At the end of March 1624, Ripon's superiors ordered him to demolish the fortress, named Fort Oranje, and concentrate his forces at Penghu. On 30 July, the Ming navy reached the Dutch fort at Penghu with 5,000–10,000 soldiers and 40-50 warships and forced the Dutch to sue for peace on 3 August. The Dutch retreated to Tayouan and established a more permanent presence there. Ripon stayed behind to oversee the dismantling of the Penghu fortress. He left Penghu on 16 September. In Taiwan, Ripon was tasked with finding food. He had a falling out with the governor and left for Batavia in December.

According to Ripon, Taiwan looked like three mountains on top of each other with the highest covered in snow for three months a year. The streets of villages appeared narrow except at public squares at the center of which stood large round buildings. Men slept in these buildings and trained in the squares. He saw headhunting activity which occurred between the time of harvest until the next planting season. The heads of enemies were held in these men's houses, where a lamp burned at all times. They held celebrations in these places after returning from war. Successful head hunters were treated with reverence.

During his time in Taiwan, Ripon's party befriended the people of Bacaloan (modern Tainan) by giving them small gifts. They led him to the woods where he was free to gather lumber and in return Ripon gave them Indian fabrics. His friendship with Bacaloan angered the neighboring Mattau people who did not receive the same gifts. Ripon described the Mattau people as quite tall, "like big giants." They attacked Ripon's party. He blamed the Chinese for inciting the natives against them. A few months later both the Bacaloan and Mattau people attacked the Dutch fortress. Three hundred tried to storm the fort by night but were repelled by cannon fire.

Other descriptions of the indigenous people of Taiwan note that raids and ambushes were the common way of warfare. It was the convention for villages to officially declare war and to pay restitution for former raids. Alliances and peace were requested by sending weapons to the other side while sending gifts of trees meant submission. In 1630, Mattau built "a sturdy double wall around their village, the inside filled with clay, as well as a moat and many demi-lunes." Fortified villages seem to have been common in Taiwan until the 19th and 20th centuries. Besides villages, the Dutch also encountered a proto-state that was ruled by someone they referred to as the "Prince [vorst] of Lonkjouw." He ruled some 16 villages and their chiefs. Succession was hereditary.

Judging by Dutch sources, Taiwan's population was probably around 100,000 in this period, with a density of around 3 to 5 persons per square kilometer depending on the region. The southwestern plains was more densely populated. The low population density led to a higher nutritional diet. Europeans visiting Taiwan noted that the aborigines looked tall and healthy. There was an abundance of animal protein in the form of deer meat.

==== Dutch ====
The Dutch contingent was composed mostly of soldiers, with some slaves and other workers from the other Dutch colonies, particularly the area around Batavia (current day Jakarta). The number of soldiers stationed on the island waxed and waned according to the military needs of the colony, from a low of 180 troops in the early days to a high of 1,800 shortly before Koxinga's invasion. There were also a number of other personnel, from traders and merchants to missionaries and schoolteachers, plus the Dutch brought with them slaves from their other colonies, who mainly served as personal slaves for important Dutch people.

As few European women came to the distant colonies during the Dutch East India Company period to accompany the administrators and soldiers from the Netherlands, the Dutch commonly took local women as wives and concubines. The children of the Dutch men and local women were generally considered legally Dutch and were raised in Dutch settlements.

A number of Dutch (or part Dutch) women were enslaved by the Chinese after the Dutch were expelled from Taiwan in 1662. During the Siege of Fort Zeelandia, in which Chinese Ming loyalist forces commanded by Koxinga besieged and defeated the Dutch East India Company and conquered Taiwan, the Chinese took women and children prisoner. The Dutch missionary Antonius Hambroek, two of his daughters, and his wife were among the prisoners of war with Koxinga. Koxinga sent Hambroek to Fort Zeelandia demanding that he persuade them to surrender or else Hambroek would be killed when he returned. Hambroek returned to the Fort, where two of his other daughters were. He urged the Fort not to surrender, assuring them that Koxinga's troops were growing hungry and rebellious, and returned to Koxinga's camp. He was then executed by decapitation. In addition to this, a rumor was spread among the Chinese that the Dutch were encouraging the native Taiwan aboriginals to kill Chinese, so Koxinga ordered the mass execution of Dutch male prisoners in retaliation. A few women and children were also killed. The surviving women and children were then turned into slaves. Koxinga took Hambroek's teenage daughter as a concubine; she was described by the Dutch commander Caeuw as "a very sweet and pleasing maiden". The other women were distributed to Koxinga's commanders, who used them as concubines. The daily journal of the Dutch fort recorded that "the best were preserved for the use of the commanders, and then sold to the common soldiers. Happy was she that fell to the lot of an unmarried man, being thereby freed from vexations by the Chinese women, who are very jealous of their husbands." The women who were taken as slave concubines and wives were never freed. In 1684 some were reported to be living in captivity. A Dutch merchant in Quemoy was contacted with an arrangement, proposed by a son of Koxinga's, to release the prisoners, but it came to nothing. Dutch-language accounts record this incident of Chinese taking women as concubines and the date of Hambroek's daughter.

According to Jonathan Manthorpe, some physical characteristics such as auburn and red hair among people in regions of south Taiwan are a legacy of the enslaved Dutch (or part Dutch) women, although he cites no scientific evidence to support his claim.

==== Han people ====
The VOC encouraged Chinese migration to Taiwan. The Dutch colony provided a military and administrative structure for Chinese immigration. It advertised to the Chinese through coastal entrepreneurs free land, freedom from taxes, the use of oxen, and loans. Sometimes they even paid the Chinese to move to Taiwan. As a result, thousands of Chinese crossed the strait and became rice and sugar planters. The Chinese settlers were of Hakka and Hokkien stock during the Dutch period. Most of them were young single men seeking to hide from Qing authorities or to hunt in Taiwan. They referred to Taiwan as The Gate of Hell for its reputation in taking the lives of sailors and explorers.

In 1625, the company started advertising Provintia to the Chinese as a site of settlement. The next year the town caught fire and shortly afterward it was beset by fever. The Chinese all fled and all the company employees grew sick. The company withdrew personnel from the town and destroyed the fortress. In 1629, the natives of Mattau and Soulang attacked Sakam and chased away the inhabitants of Provintia. In 1632, the company began encouraging Chinese to plant sugarcane in Sakam by providing them money and cattle. The efforts came to fruition and by 1634 there was sugar "as white as that of China." By 1635, Chinese entrepreneurs were preparing for larger plantations. In the spring, 300 Chinese laborers arrived. The Chinese also cultivated rice but access to water was difficult and by 1639 the Chinese had lost their desire to plant rice. This problem was addressed in the early 1640s and rice production began to grow again. Other industries began to spring up: butchers, blacksmiths, coopers, carpenters, curriers, cobblers, masons, tailors among them. In the 1640s the Dutch began to tax them, reaping large benefits, causing some Chinese to become discontent. After 1648, nearly all company revenue came from the Chinese.

The Chinese were allowed property rights in a limited area and the Dutch made efforts to prevent the Chinese from mingling with the natives. Initially the company policy was to protect the Chinese from the natives but later the policy shifted to trying to keep Chinese from influencing the natives. The native people traded meat and hides for salt, iron, and clothing from Chinese traders who sometimes stayed in their villages. In the interior, deer skins were traded by the aborigines. In 1634 the Dutch ordered the Chinese to sell deerskins to no one but the company since the Japanese offered better prices. By 1636, Chinese hunters were entering previously native-lands where the Dutch had removed the natives to greater profit from the deer economy. Commercial hunters replaced the natives and used the pitfall to increase deer products. By 1638 the future of the deer population was being questioned. Restrictions were put on hunting periods but this proved insufficient so the use of the pitfall was also restricted.

In 1636, Favorolang, the largest aboriginal village north of Mattau, killed three Chinese and wounded several others while harassing Chinese hunters and fishers. In August a large band of Favorolangers appeared at Wankan north of Fort Zeelandia. In November the Favorolangers captured a Chinese fishing vessel. The next year the Dutch and their native allies defeated Favorolang. The expedition was paid for by the Chinese populace. When peace negotiations failed, the Dutch blamed a group of Chinese at Favorolang. The Favorolangers continued to attack hunters even in fields belonging to other villages until 1638. In 1640 an incident involving the capture of a Favorolang leader and the ensuing death of three Dutch hunters near Favorolang resulted in the banning of Chinese hunters from Favorolang territory. The Dutch blamed the Chinese and orders were given from Batavia to restrict Chinese residency and travel. No Chinese vessel was allowed around Taiwan unless it carried a company license. An expedition was ordered to chase away the Chinese from the land and to subjugate the natives to the north. In November 1642, an expedition set out northward, killing 19 natives and 11 Chinese, and executing the Chinese and natives responsible for the murder of three Dutchmen. A policy banning any Chinese from living north of Mattau was implemented. In 1644 the Chinese were allowed to live in Favorolang to conduct trade if they purchased a permit. The Favorolangers were told that the Chinese "were despicable people [vuyle menschen] who sought to instill in them false opinions of us [the Dutch]" and to capture any Chinese who did not possess a permit.

In the late 1630s, officials in Batavia started pressuring the authority in Taiwan to increase revenues. The Dutch started collecting voluntary donations from the Chinese but these donations were not reliable. In addition to a 10 percent tax on venison, beer, salt, mullet, arrack, bricks and mortar, and real estate sales, they also implemented a residency-permit tax (hoofdbrieven). In August and September 1640, some 3,568 Chinese were charged a quarter of a real per month, increasing to some 4,450 Chinese payments on average. All male Chinese were taxed for residency. Checks were made by soldiers at inspection points so that the Chinese could not move to another village without permission. Any transgression could be punished with a fine, beating, or imprisonment. Chinese settlers began protesting the residency tax, that the Dutch harassed them on roads for pay. In 1646, the Council informed the Chinese that they only had to answer to specific officials; however, complaints continued. According to a report, "soldiers not only confiscate their hoofdbrieven, in order to prosecute them and demand a fine, but also take their meager possessions, seizing anything they can get their hands on, whether chickens, pigs, rice, clothing, bedding, or furniture.

The Dutch also auctioned off the collection of taxes for rice farming and sold the right to trade with aboriginal villages. However, the Dutch thought the Chinese were exploiting the natives by selling at high prices: "for the Chinese . . . are even more deceptive and deceitful than the Jews, and will not sell their goods . . . for a more civil price unless [the company] stopped selling leases altogether." The sale of rights to trade with aborigines was not just a way to raise profits but to keep track of the Chinese and prevent them from mingling with the natives. Policing the rights to trade in aboriginal villages and alterations to the system eventually caused the reputation of the company to drop, gaining for them a reputation of tyranny.

==== Others ====
The Dutch had Pampang and Quinamese (Vietnamese) slaves on their colony in Taiwan, and in 1643 offered rewards to aboriginal allies who would recapture the slaves for them when they ran away. Eighteen Quinamese and Java slaves were involved in a Dutch attack against the Tammalaccouw aboriginals, along with 110 Chinese and 225 troops under Governor Traudenius on 11 January 1642. Seven Quinamese and three Javanese persons were involved in a gold hunting expedition along with 200 Chinese individuals and 218 troops under Senior Merchant Cornelis Caesar from November 1645 to January 1646. "Quinam" was the Dutch name for the Vietnamese Nguyen lord-ruled Cochinchina (which was used in the 17th century to refer to the area around Quang Nam in central Vietnam, (Annam) until in 1860 the French shifted the term Cochinchina to refer to the Mekong Delta in the far south, and Pampang was a place in Java which was ruled by the Dutch East India Company in the East Indies. The Dutch sided with the Trịnh lords of Tonkin (Northern Vietnam) against the Nguyen Lords of Quinam (Cochinchina) during the Trịnh–Nguyễn War and were therefore hostile to Quinam.

== Taiwanese natives under Dutch Formosa ==
=== Background ===
Before Dutch settlement in the seventeenth century, Taiwanese indigenous peoples lived in numerous tribal systems uniquely autonomous of each other; with populations between a thousand and a hundred, a census conducted by the Dutch in 1650 surmised that there were below 50,000 natives in the plains area. Despite temporary alliances, similar agricultural practices, and a few inter-marriages, the tribes exhibited distinct linguistic and internal structure differences. These differences coupled with the widespread practice of head-hunting caused Formosan groups to be suspicious and cautious of strangers.

Upon arrival, the first indigenous groups the Dutch made contact with were the Sinkang (新港), Backloan (目加溜灣), Soelangh (蕭), and Mattauw (麻豆). The native Taiwanese tribes' antagonistic predispositions led to an initial hostile relationship with the Dutch, involving several uprisings including the Hamada Yahei incident of 1628 involving the Sinkang people, and the killing of 20 Dutch soldiers in 1629 by the Mattauw tribe. The VOC eventually transitioned into a divide-and-conquer strategy, and went on to create an alliance with the Sinkang and Seolangh tribes against the Mattauw, simultaneously conquering numerous tribes that did not comply with these commands.

This interventionist process included the massacre of the indigenous people inhabiting Lamay Island in 1642 by Dutch forces led by Officer Francois Caron. After these events, the indigenous people eventually were forced into pacification under military domination and were used for a variety of labor activities during the span of Dutch Formosa. According to documents in 1650, Dutch settlers ruled "315 tribal villages with a total population of around 68,600, estimated 40-50% of the entire indigenes of the island".

=== Religion ===
The VOC set up a tax system and schools to teach romanized script of aboriginal languages and evangelize Christianity as practiced in the Dutch Reformed Church.

The native Taiwanese religion was primarily animist and considered sinful and less civilized. The Formosans practiced various activities which the Dutch perceived as sinful or at least uncivilised, including mandatory abortion (by massage) for women under 37, frequent marital infidelity, non-observation of the Christian Sabbath and general nakedness. The Protestant bible was translated into indigenous Formosan languages and evangelized among the tribes. This was the first entrance of Christianity into Taiwan.

=== Education ===
The missionaries were also responsible for setting up schools in the villages under Dutch control, teaching not only the religion of the colonists but also other skills such as reading and writing. Prior to Dutch arrival the native inhabitants did not use writing, and the missionaries created a number of writing schemes for the various Formosan languages based on the Latin script. This is the first record in history of a written language in Taiwan.

The success of the Sinkang Script introduced amongst the Siraya people and others who learned, empowered the native population to have a script specific to their .language. Use of the script is found in land contracts with the Han Chinese into the 18th Century.

Experiments were made with teaching native children the Dutch language, but these were abandoned fairly rapidly after they failed to produce good results. At least one Formosan received an education in the Netherlands; he eventually married a Dutch woman and was apparently well integrated into Dutch society.

=== Technology ===
The unique variety of trading resources (in particular, deerskins, venison and sugarcane), as well as the untouched nature of Formosa led to an extremely lucrative market for the VOC. A journal record written by the Dutch governor Pieter Nuyts holds that "Taiwan was an excellent trading port, enabling 100 per cent profits to be made on all goods". In monopolizing on these goods, Taiwanese natives were used as manual labor, whose skills were honed in the employment on sugarcane farms and deer hunting.

Similarly, the Dutch upheaved the traditional agricultural practices in favor of more modern systems. The native tribes in the field-regions were taught how to use Western systems of crop management that used more sustainable and efficient ecological technologies, albeit attributed mostly to the fact that due to the increased exploitation of the land, alternative means of management were needed to veer off the extinction of deer and sugar resources.

The Dutch introduced well-digging, as well as bringing both oxen and cattle to the island.

=== Military ===
Taiwanese aborigines became an important part of maintaining a stable milieu and eliminating conflicts during the latter half of Dutch rule. According to the Daily Journals of Fort Zeelandia (Dutch: De dagregisters van het kasteel Zeelandia), the Dutch frequently employed males from nearby indigenous tribes, including Hsin-kang (新港) and Mattau (麻豆), as foot-soldiers in the general militia, to heighten their numbers when quick action was needed during rebellions or uprisings. Such was the case during that of the Guo Huaiyi rebellion in 1652, where the conspirators were eventually bested and subdued by the Dutch through the sourcing of over a hundred native Taiwanese aborigines.

However, the Taiwanese indigenous tribes who were previously allied with the Dutch against the Chinese during the Guo Huaiyi rebellion in 1652 turned against the Dutch during the later siege of Fort Zeelandia and defected to Koxinga's Chinese forces. The indigenous (Formosans) of Sincan defected to Koxinga after he offered them amnesty; the Sincan indigenous then proceeded to work for the Chinese and behead Dutch people in executions; the frontier indigenous in the mountains and plains also surrendered and defected to the Chinese on 17 May 1661, celebrating their freedom from compulsory education under the Dutch rule by hunting down Dutch people and beheading them and trashing their Christian school textbooks. The Taiwanese indigenous peoples attacked both the Chinese and the Dutch. In the Kingdom of Middag, the natives welcomed warmly the troops led by Koxinga's commander, Chen Ze. When Chen Ze's troops had been lulled into a false sense of security, the natives killed them in their sleep, wiping out 1,500 of Koxinga's army. This was the worst of several native attacks on the Chinese. The second worst case occurred in the south, where another 700 of Koxinga's forces were wiped out by the natives.

== Legacy and contributions ==
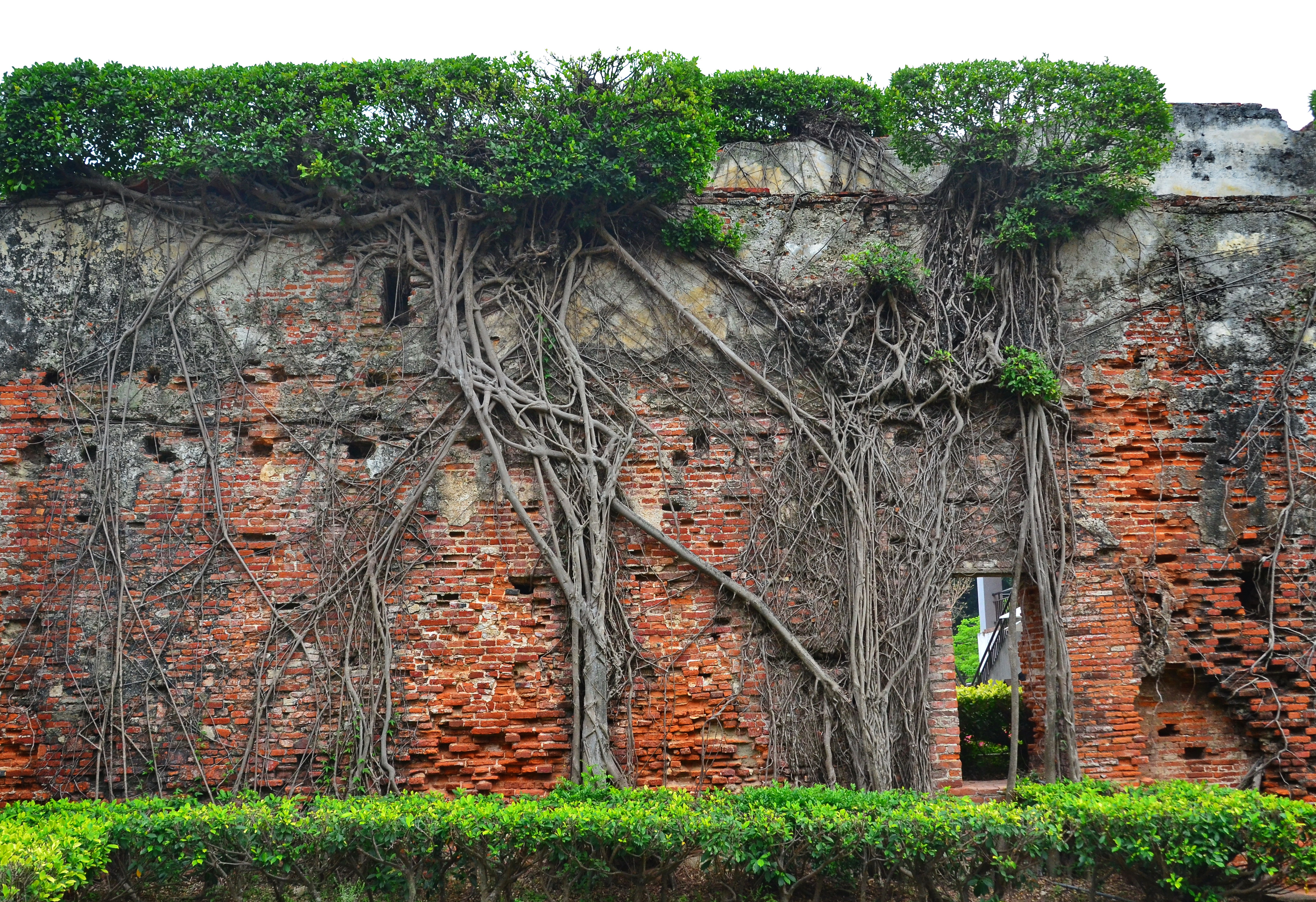
Wall of Fort Zeelandia/Fort Anping

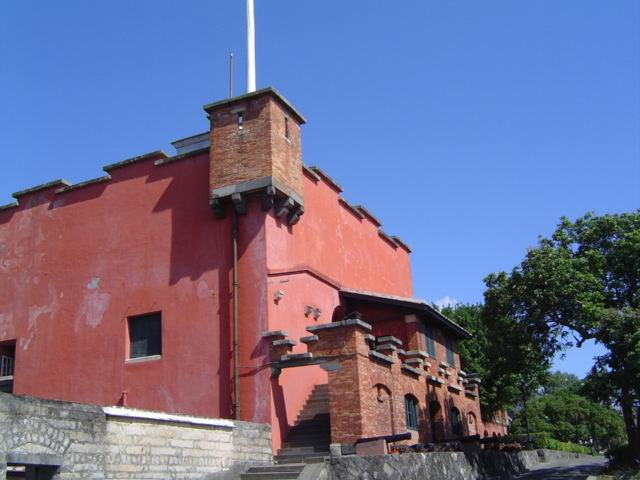
Fort Antonio today

Today the legacy of the Dutch in Taiwan is visible in the Anping District of Tainan City, where the remains of Fort Zeelandia is preserved; in Tainan City itself, where Fort Provintia is still the main structure of what is now called Red-Topped Tower; and finally in Tamsui, where Fort Antonio (Fort Santo Domingo museum complex) still stands as the best preserved redoubt (minor fort) of the Dutch East India Company anywhere in the world. The building was later used by the British consulate until the United Kingdom severed ties with the KMT (Chinese Nationalist Party or Kuomintang) regime and its formal relationship with Taiwan.

Similarly, much of the economic policy driven by the Dutch during the colonial period was subsequently used as a basis for the beginnings of Taiwan's modern international trade. The beginnings of Taiwan's mercantile history and contemporary economy can be attributed to the port systems that were facilitated during the Dutch Formosa period.

However, perhaps the most lasting result of Dutch rule is the immigration of Chinese people to the island. At the start of the Dutch era, there were estimated to be between 1,000 and 1,500 Chinese persons in Taiwan, mostly traders living in indigenous villages. During Dutch Formosa rule, Dutch colonial policies encouraged the active immigration of Han Chinese in order to solidify the ecological and agricultural trade establishments and help maintain control over the area. Because of these reasons, by the end of the colonial period, Taiwan had many Chinese villages holding tens of thousands of people in total, and the ethnic balance of the island was already well on the way to favouring the newly arrived Chinese over the indigenous tribes. Furthermore, Dutch settlers opened up communication between both peoples, and set about maintaining relationships with both Han Chinese and indigenous Taiwanese, which were non-existent beforehand.

The Dutch introduced the domestic turkey to Taiwan.

=== Legend ===
According to Frederick Coyett, many people saw mermaids appearing in the waters near the Fort Zeelandia during Koxinga's attack on the Dutch. The Dutch came to the waterways to search carefully, but they were gone. It was regarded as a sign of imminent disaster.

== See also ==
- Dutch pacification campaign on Formosa
- Eighty Years' War
- Han Taiwanese: Influence of the Dutch language
- History of Taiwan
- Landdag

== Notes ==
| Preceded by Prehistory of Taiwan until 1624 | Dutch Formosa; 1624–1662 | Succeeded by Kingdom of Tungning; 1662–1683 |
