= Fort Santo Domingo =

Former fort in New Taipei, Taiwan

- 紅毛城
- Tamsui, New Taipei City, Taiwan
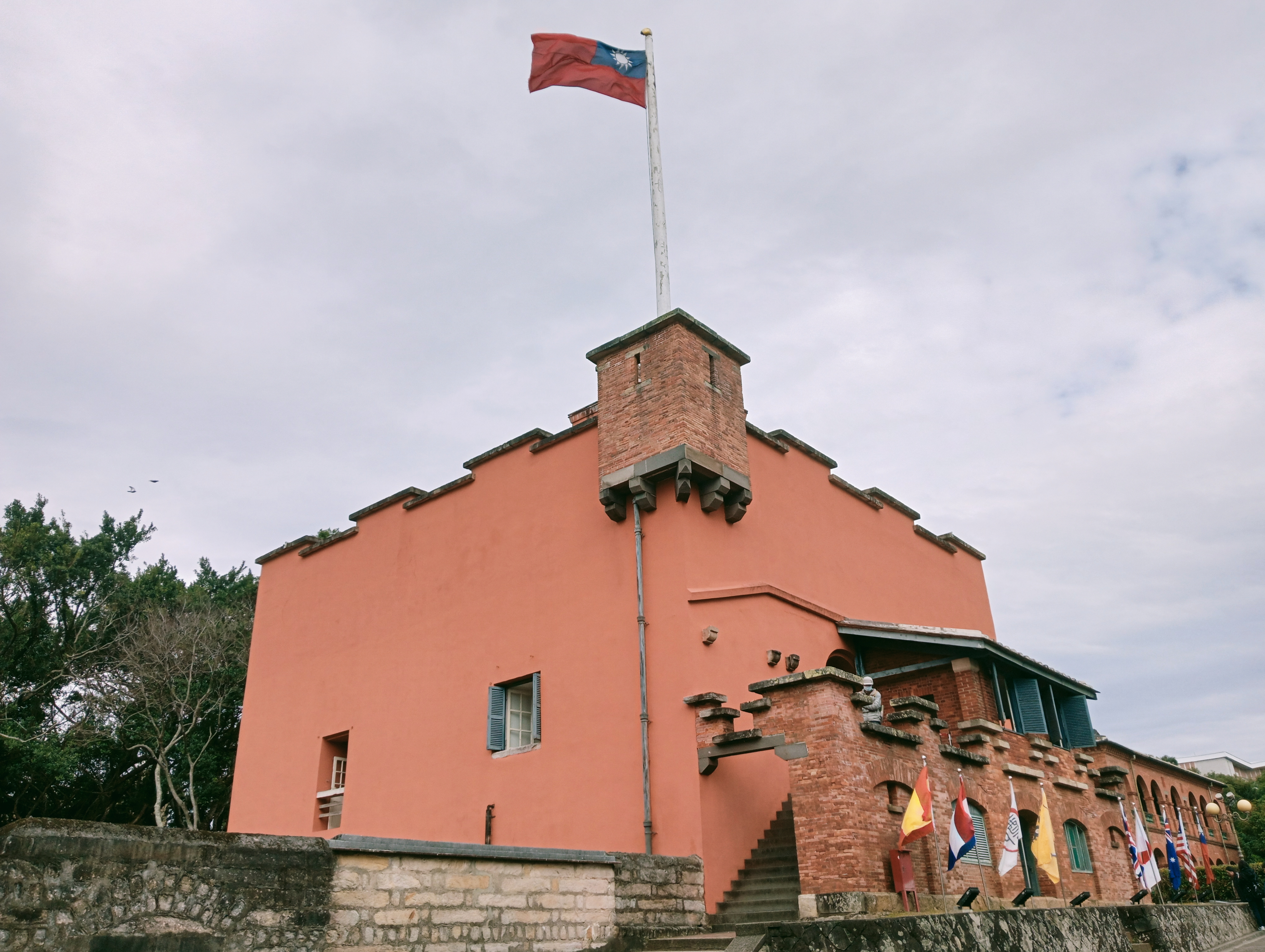

Site information
- Type: Fort
- Website: Fort Santo Domingo

Location
- Taiwan
- Coordinates: 25°10′31″N 121°26′00″E

Site history
- Built: 1644
- Built by: Spanish East Indies (demolished structure); Dutch East India Company (extant structure)

Fort Santo Domingo
- Traditional Chinese: 紅毛城
Transcriptions
Standard Mandarin
- Hanyu Pinyin: Hóngmáochéng
- Bopomofo: ㄏㄨㄥˊ ㄇㄠˊ ㄔㄥˊ
Southern Min
- Hokkien POJ: Âng-mn̂g-siâⁿ
- Tâi-lô: Âng-mn̂g-siânn

Alternative Chinese name
- Traditional Chinese: 聖多明哥城
Transcriptions
Standard Mandarin
- Hanyu Pinyin: Shèng Duōmínggē chéng
- Bopomofo: ㄕㄥˋ ㄉㄨㄛ ㄇㄧㄥˊ ㄍㄜ ㄔㄥˊ
Southern Min
- Hokkien POJ: Sèng To-bêng-ko Siâⁿ
- Tâi-lô: Sìng To-bêng-ko Siânn

External images
- Aerial photograph of Fort Santo Domingo： The rectangular architecture in the front is the main fortress of Fort Santo Domingo, while the two-storied building behind it is the former British consul's residence.
- Taiwan Historical-Site Stamp: Fort Santo Domingo： The 5-dollar stamp produced by the government of Taiwan in 1985.
- Taiwanese Commemorative Coins of 2010： The sculpture in the back of 100 dollar is the main architecture of Fort Santo Domingo

Fort Santo Domingo is a historical fortress in Tamsui District, New Taipei City, Taiwan. It was originally a wooden fort built in 1628 by the Manila-based Spanish East Indies of the Spanish Empire, who named it in Spanish: el Fuerte de Santo Domingo, lit. 'the Fort of Saint Dominic'. However, after refurbishing it in stone, the initial fort was repeatedly ordered to be dismantled and withdrawn from around 1637 by Spanish Governor-General Sebastián Hurtado de Corcuera for economic downsizing and retrenchment, which their rival Dutch East India Company (VOC) of the Dutch Empire soon found out and later invaded in 1641 and won by the Second Battle of San Salvador in 1642. After the battle, the Dutch rebuilt a fort in the original site in 1644 and renamed it in Dutch: Fort Antonio, after Antonio van Diemen, the then Governor-General of the Dutch East India Company (VOC). Since the Dutch were called in Taiwanese Hokkien Chinese: 紅毛; Pe̍h-ōe-jī: Âng-mn̂g; lit. 'Red-haired (people)') by the Han Chinese immigrants during the time, the fort was then nicknamed in Taiwanese Hokkien Chinese: 紅毛城; Pe̍h-ōe-jī: Âng-mn̂g-siâⁿ; lit. 'Red-hair (ang mo) fort'.

In 1724, the Qing Government repaired the fort, and built a perimeter wall with four gates. From 1868 onwards the fort was leased to the British government as its consulate, and a new two-storey building was built nearby as the consul's residence. The fort continued to be used as a British consulate during Japanese rule, but was briefly closed during the Pacific War.

After the war, it was returned to British control. The site was used as the British consulate until 1972, though official diplomatic relations between Republic of China (Taiwan) and the United Kingdom were terminated in 1950. Afterwards the fort was temporarily managed by Australia and the United States of America, before the fort was returned to the government of Republic of China (Taiwan) in 1980. Since then, the fort has been a National Historical Site, open to tourists and archaeologists alike. It is considered a potential World Heritage Site.

The site of Fort Santo Domingo includes the main fortress, the former British consul's residence, and the south gate built during Qing dynasty. Among the architectures, the main fortress is one of the oldest buildings on the whole island, and there were four cannons placed in the front of the fortress, which could be traced back to Jiaqing era. The former British consul's residence is on the east side of the main fortress, and is a two-storey English-style building. The south gate is the only Chinese style architecture among all the buildings, and is made from Guangin Stones.

Fort Santo Domingo is located near Hobe Fort, which was built during the late Qing era.

== History ==
=== Spanish Era ===
After the Spanish established a permanent colony at San Salvador (Palm Island; modern-day Hoping Island), they proceeded in 1629 to occupy Tamsui, "which even at this early period was frequented by many Chinese merchants, who came from Fokien to barter with the Formosa natives." On a night in 1636, a group of local people, angered by the taxes that the Spanish governor had imposed, successfully attacked the fort and demolished it. In 1637, the Spanish rebuilt the fort using stone and raised the walls' height to twenty feet or more. A church was also built on a hill, and the locals helped to make a road to it from the fort. "Peter Nuits the Dutch Governor of Formosa, reported these facts to his home authorities and exposed in an interesting report the injury that the Spaniards were doing to Dutch trade and the necessity of sending an expedition to drive them away."

Owing to economic downturn affecting the Spanish Empire (during the last years of the Iberian Union) around the 1630s to 1640s, shrinking revenues and rising defense costs and the Spanish East Indies's armies and resources spread thin on multiple fronts with multiple enemies (e.g. Johor Sultanate, Maguindanao Sultanate, Dutch East India Company as part of the Dutch-Portuguese War), the Spanish Governor-Generals of the time saw the Spanish presence in Taiwan as a drain on resources and personnel. Governor-General Sebastián Hurtado de Corcuera would write letters in 1636 to King Philip IV: "That the enemy [Dutch East India Company] maintains a post [in Formosa] does not at all embarrass or hinder the Crown of Castile, for the Chinese do not fail to come in twenty-four hours to the forts of Your Majesty that are on this side of the sea [i.e., Manila], bringing the necessary merchandise and supplies. That island, Sire, is of very little use to your Majesty, and it serves only to consume a large part of the revenues." Rather than waiting for the king's response, Corcuera convened a war council proposing to abandon Spanish Formosa or withdraw some of its forces, as it was then deemed as a waste of soldiers, money, and food supplies, as shipments directly arriving to Spanish Manila brought by Chinese merchant ships was deemed more economical, ideally plying the route from Portuguese Macau rather than going near Dutch Formosa that the Portuguese and Spanish as part of the Iberian Union were at war with in the Dutch-Portuguese War. Nearly all members of the war council agreed but Governor-General Corcuera forgoed advising the king on the matter and ordered the governor of Spanish Formosa to send a force to punish the natives who attacked Fort Santo Domingo in 1636 to make sure any withdrawal of manpower and abandonment of the fort did not show fear of the natives, then the governor was to withdraw all artillery and soldiers and dismantle it entirely to take back to the main fort in Keelung and downsize most all manpower and resources back to Manila, leaving only 125 soldiers in Keelung. The governor in Keelung was reluctant to carry this order out since he had just renovated Fort Santo Domingo with stone, so it appears that he did not dismantle the fort, but at least brought back most of the personnel on October 24, 1637, back to the Philippines. Corcuera got mad at him and reappointed a new governor repeating his previous order to dismantle Fort Santo Domingo and withdraw all forces to Keelung with the previous governor later being exiled to Ternate for his disobedience. The new governor followed through on dismantling Fort Santo Domingo, except leaving a small redoubt guarding an entrance to Keelung. Corcuera ordered more forces to be recalled from Formosa and reduced the yearly supply ships from Manila to Formosa from two to one.

With the remaining force in Keelung, Spanish authority beyond Keelung collapsed as the natives of Tamsui believed that the Spanish left out of fear "because those who had until then lived in a fortress of cane and wood now did not even dare to be in one of stone." The Spanish friars who used to live outside the forts and ventured far from military outposts were now afraid to leave the fort in Keelung and the paths between Tamsui and Keelung were now dangerous even for a group of armed Spaniards. Fewer Chinese merchant ships arrived as well and the few who arrived found that the Spanish force in Keelung had no money anymore to buy from them. What little money was left was used to strengthen the fort in Keelung. The Spanish friars in Keelung sent letters to Manila to lobby to invest more in Formosa, which the friars of Manila urged the Governor-General, but Corcuera repeatedly refused to the point that he would use Formosa as a place of exile for one of his enemies.

Rumors soon reached the Dutch through the Chinese merchant ships telling them that the Spanish intended to abandon Formosa entirely, just waiting for permission from their king. The Dutch who had heard of reports of gold mines in the northeast of Formosa felt they could not go prospecting until the Spanish presence was removed. The Dutch learned more of the Spanish situation from Chinese merchants, which later in April 1641, they allowed a Chinese merchant to send two junk ships from the Bay of Tayouan (Anping, Tainan, Dutch Formosa) to Tamsui to buy sulfur, but at the same time carrying Dutch soldiers and a VOC official, which were welcomed in Tamsui. A small group of Dutch soldiers also surveyed the east coast of Formosa and arrived within about 30 km of Keelung. In August 1641, the Dutch sailed to the Bay of Keelung, studying the Spanish situation.

After a failed first attempt in 1641, the Dutch made a second expedition on 3 August 1642: "the Dutch appeared off Tamsui with a comparatively powerful squadron of four frigates, a large cutter, nine small vessels, besides several transports..." After the Dutch mounted artillery at an elevation commanding the fort, they succeeded in taking the fort on 24 August. The Dutch also expelled the Spaniards from nearby Keelung. The Spanish fort in Tamsui had by then already been razed by the Spanish themselves. It is also claimed that no traces remain of the forts on Palm Island, as they were destroyed by Zheng Jing, son of Koxinga.

=== Dutch era ===
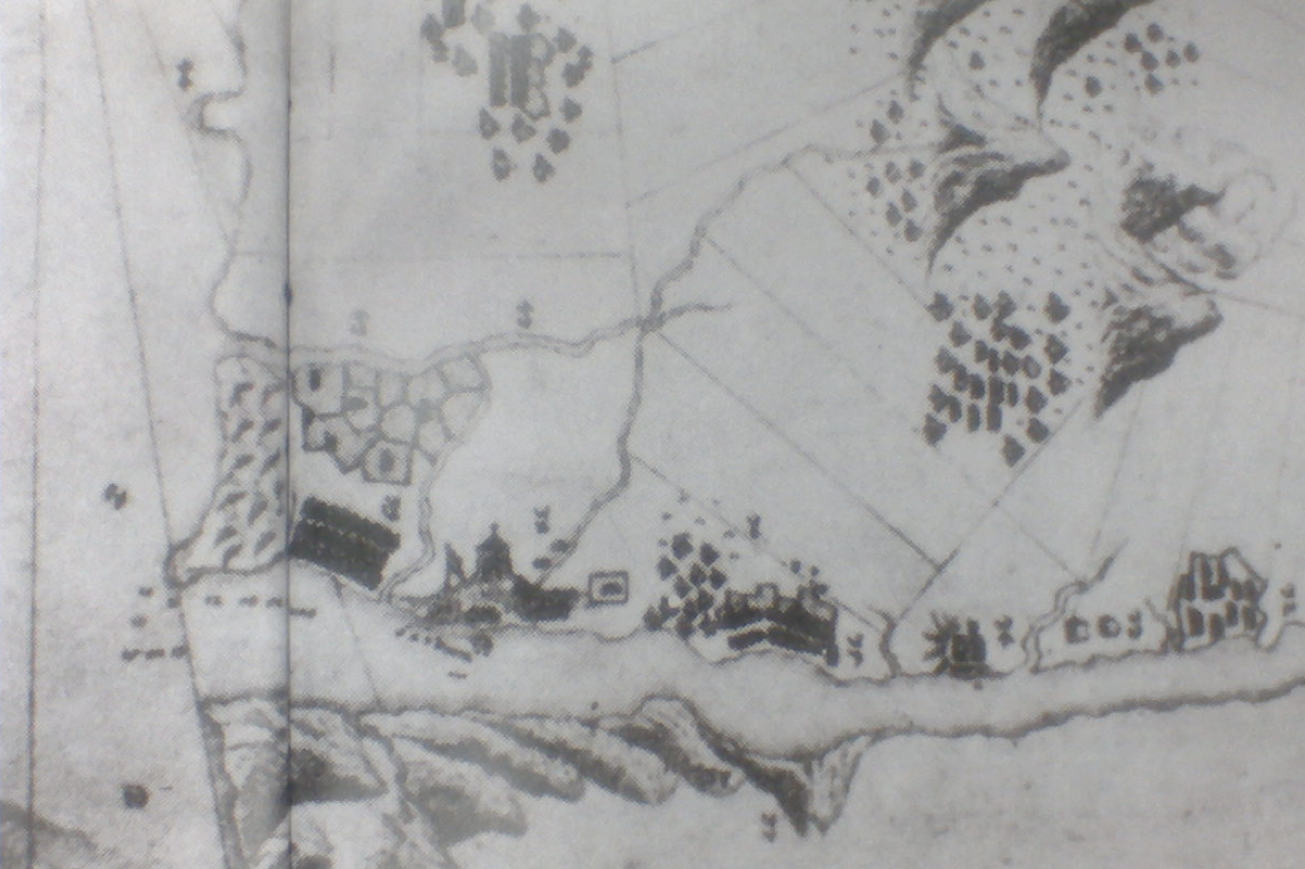
The ancient map drawn by the Dutch in 1654, the sharp-top fortress within it is the Fort Antonio

The Dutch then became the "undisputed masters of Formosa", and built a new fort on the site with the intention to maintain the trade of sulfur and deer skin, while also deploying vessels in the Tamsui River to protect the trading zone. The fort was named as Fort Antonio, with the name of Governors-General of the Dutch East Indies, Anthony van Diemen, during the time.

In 1644, they replaced it with the structure still standing today, also called Fort Antonio. The "Old Dutch Fort" made of brick and stone has been described as "impregnable against any engines of war that those early days could produce."

The locals called the Dutch "the red-haired people", which led to the compound's Hokkien name (Chinese: 紅毛城; Pe̍h-ōe-jī: Âng-mn̂g-siâⁿ; lit. 'ang mo fort').

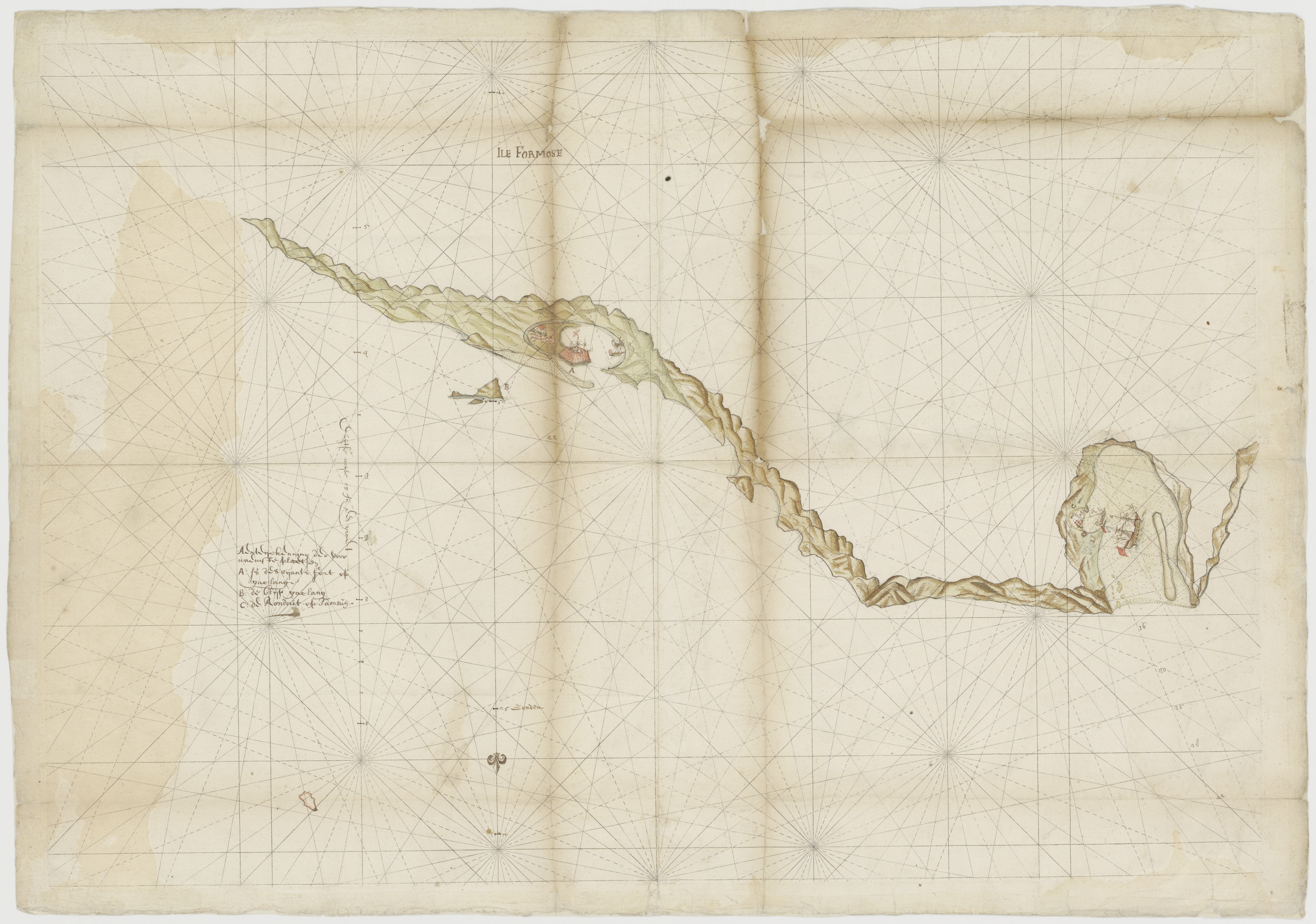
Map of the Spanish fort at Tamsui, later in hands of the VOC

=== Qing era ===
From 1683 to 1867 the Qing dynasty Chinese government controlled the fort and during this time (1724) built a stone wall with four gates around it, of which only one, the main gate, survives.

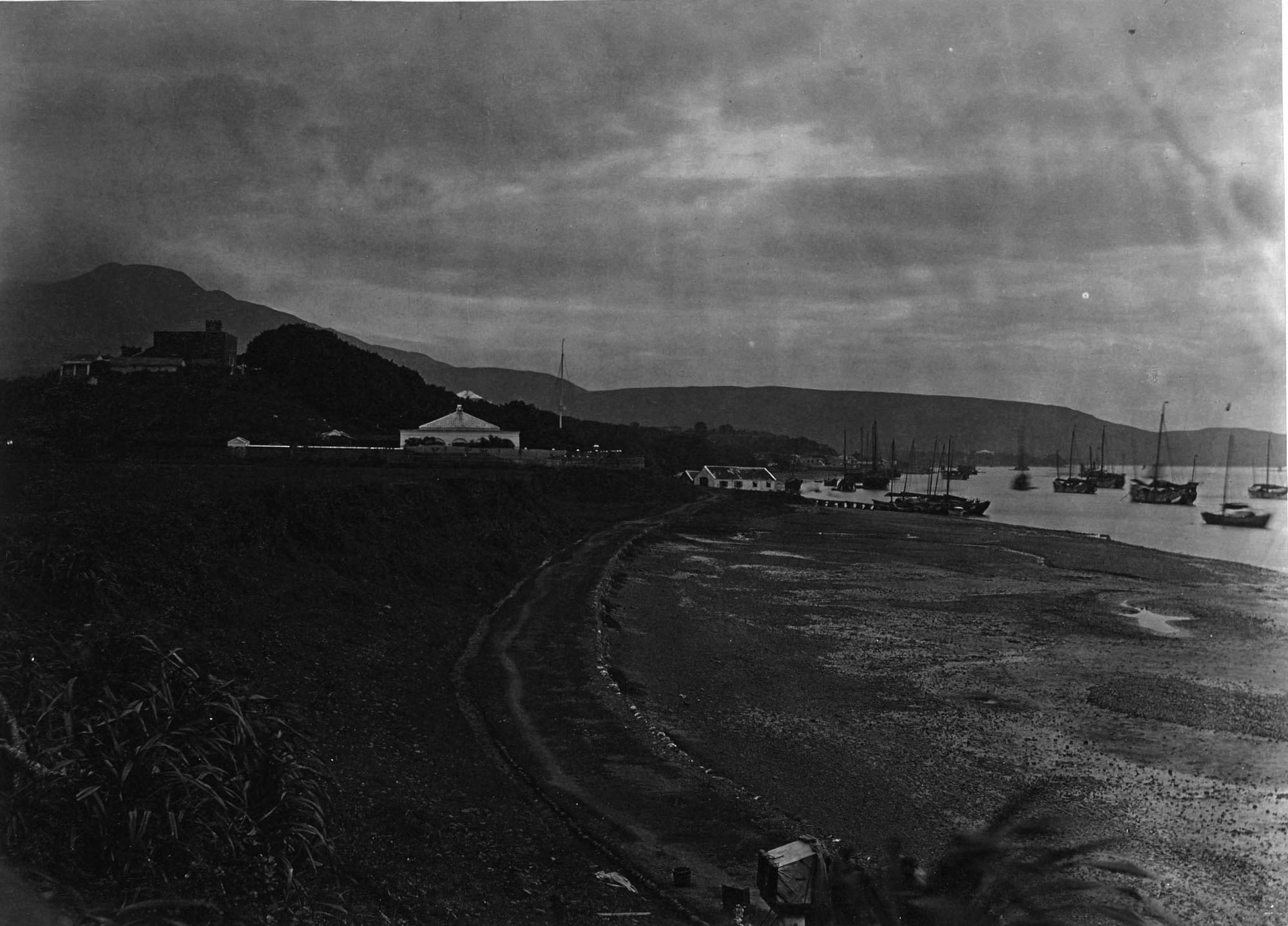
Fort Santo Domingo and bay, taken between 1860 and 1880.

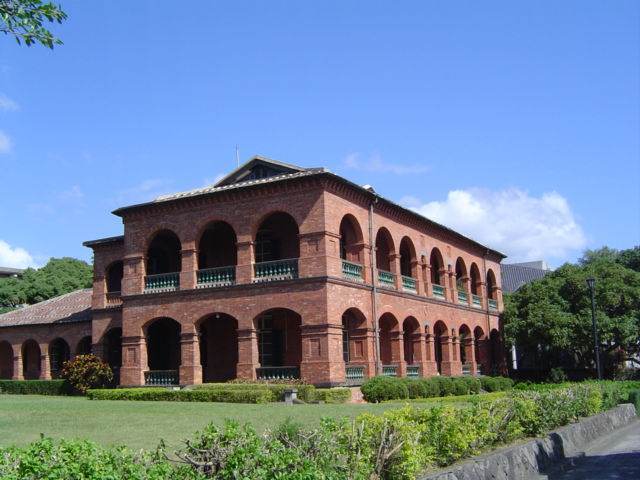
The former British consular residence next to the fort.

Following the Second Opium War, in 1868 the British took over the fort, made it their trade consulate, and painted it red (it was previously white). The fort was struck during the 1884 French bombardment of the Battle of Tamsui but suffered no damage. The linguist Herbert Allen Giles resided in the fort from 1885 to 1888 and completed some of his work on the Wade-Giles system of romanization of Standard Chinese there. Next to the fort the British built their consular residence in 1891.

The Fort is adjacent to Aletheia University, which traces its origins back to 1872 when the Reverend Dr. George Leslie Mackay, a Canadian Presbyterian, established a mission and then a medical service and a school.

=== Modern era ===
The consulate closed during World War II and reopened after the end of the war. The premises remained as the British consulate in Taiwan until 1972, when the United Kingdom and the People's Republic of China upgraded their diplomatic relations to the ambassadorial level. It was then entrusted to the Australian Embassy in Taiwan for temporary administration for several months, until Australia recognized the PRC, after which it was entrusted to the United States for administration. Aletheia University then attempted to acquire the fort, but no deal was reached by the time negotiations ended in 1978. The government of the Republic of China terminated the lease in 1980, taking ownership of the fort by 30 June. It was opened to tourists on 25 December 1984.

The fort is classified as a grade one listed historical site and is now a museum with the interior recreated from photographs. In 2003, maintenance of the site was entrusted to the Taipei County Government from the Ministry of the Interior. It was reopened after refurbishment in 2005.

== Tourist information ==
The fort and the former British consular residence, a Victorian house incorporating Chinese elements, now function as a museum. The location overlooks the Tamsui River and Guanyin Mountain.

The fort is open to the public Tuesday – Sunday, 9am – 5pm. There is an NT$80 charge for admission, with some exceptions.

== Transport ==
The fort is accessible within walking distance North West from Tamsui Station of the Taipei Metro.

== See also ==
- Taiwan under Spanish rule
- Taiwan under Dutch rule
- Fort Provintia
- Fort Zeelandia (Taiwan)
- Cape Santiago (Taiwan)
- Eternal Golden Castle
- History of Taiwan

== Bibliography ==
- Davidson, James W. (1903). The Island of Formosa, Past and Present : history, people, resources, and commercial prospects : tea, camphor, sugar, gold, coal, sulphur, economical plants, and other productions. London and New York: Macmillan. OL 6931635M.
