= Martinus Sonck =

Martinus or Maarten Sonck (also Marten; Soncq; Sonk) (ca. 1590, Amsterdam? – August 1625, Anping) was the first Dutch governor of Formosa from 1624 to 1625.

Sonck, who in 1612 lived in Amsterdam, studied law at Leiden University from October 1612 to March 1616. In 1618 Sonck was sent by the Dutch East Indies Company as “advocaat-fiscaal” (a district attorney) to Batavia, where he arrived in 1619. He subsequently became governor of the Banda Islands. In 1623 he was recalled to Batavia to account for the use of excessive amounts of ammunition at gun salutes (he was to pay for it out of his own pocket). On 4 May 1624 the governing body in Batavia decided to send him to replace Cornelis Reijersen as commander of the Dutch fort and trading base on Peng-hu, the main island of the Pescadores west of Formosa. The Pescadores were Chinese territory, and after a failed accord, Nan Juyi, the governor of Fujian, sent an army to attack Peng-hu in July 1624.

Sonck arrived at the Pescadores on 1 August on board the ship Zeelandia. On 25 August, after negotiations via Li Dan, head of the illegal traders on Taiwan, Sonck succumbed under the pressure and withdrew his contingent to Formosa, where he founded Fort Zeelandia near the town Anping. The Dutch monopolized the harbour, while Zheng Zhilong, or Nicolas Iquan, became a privateer for the Dutch, attacking trade between China and Manila. This constituted the beginning of the colonial presence of the Dutch on Formosa.

Sonck was governor of Dutch Formosa for only one year, as he drowned in Anping harbour in August 1625. According to another author, he died in December 1626. He was buried at Fort Zeelandia. He was succeeded by Gerard Frederikszoon de With.

== Bibliography ==
- Valentijn, François (1903) [First published 1724 in Oud en Nieuw Oost-Indiën]. "History of the Dutch Trade". In Campbell, William (ed.). Formosa Under the Dutch: Described from Contemporary Records, with Explanatory Notes and a Bibliography of the Island. London: Kegan Paul. pp. 25–75. LCCN 04007338.

Political offices
First	Governor of Formosa; 1624–1625	Succeeded by Gerard Frederikszoon de With
