= Fort Provintia =

Dutch outpost in Taiwan

- 赤嵌樓
- West Central, Tainan, Taiwan
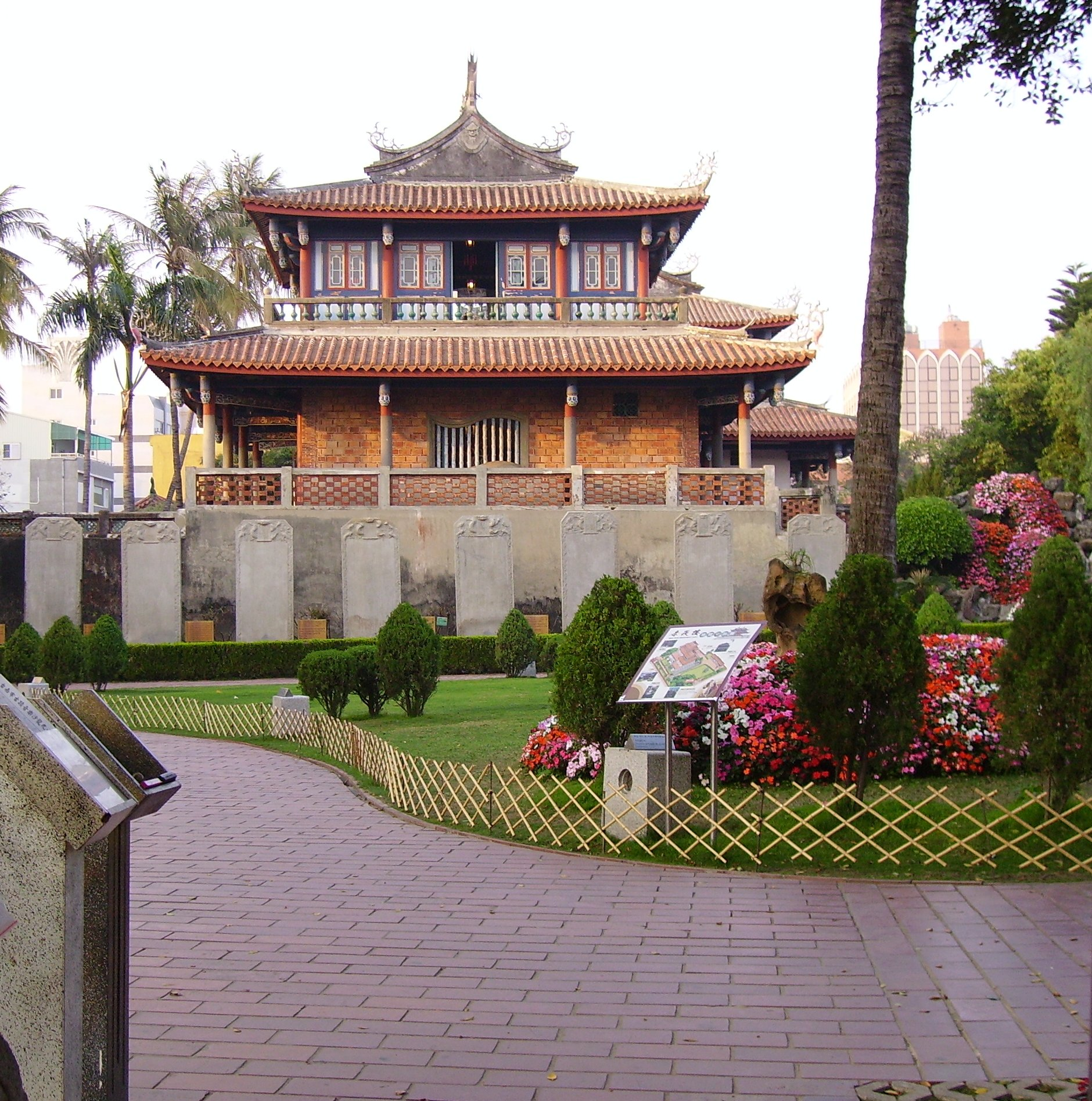

Site information
- Type: Fort

Location
- Location within Tainan
- Coordinates: 22°59′51″N 120°12′10.12″E

Site history
- Built: 1653

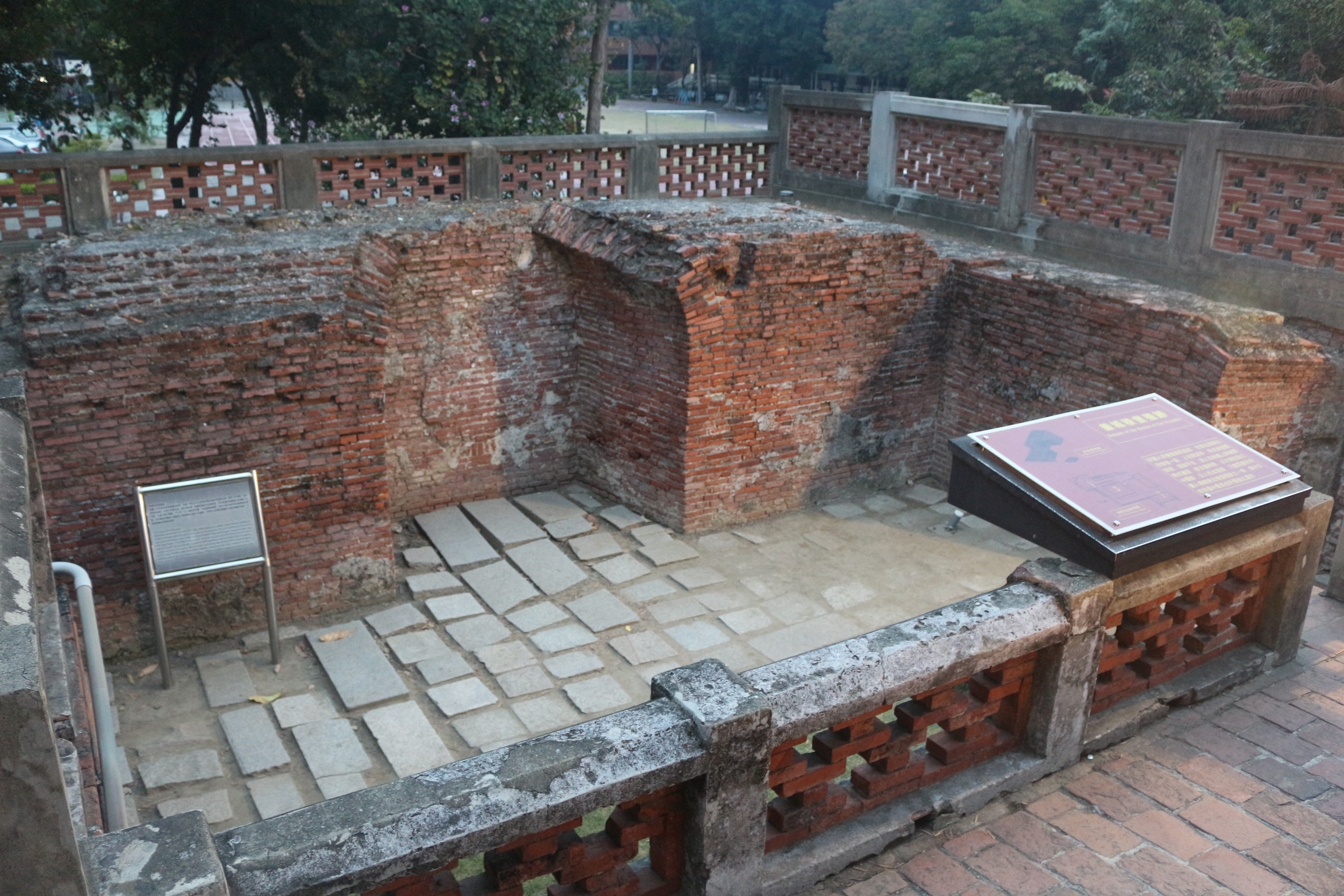
Remains of the wall of the original fort

Fort Provintia or Providentia, also known as Chihkan Tower (Chinese: 赤嵌樓; pinyin: Chìkǎnlóu; Pe̍h-ōe-jī: Chhiah-khám-lâu), was a Dutch outpost on Formosa at a site now located in West Central District, Tainan, Taiwan. It was built in 1653 during the Dutch colonization of Taiwan. The Dutch, intending to strengthen their standing, sited the fort at Sakam, about 2 miles (3.2 km) due east from modern-day Anping. During the Siege of Fort Zeelandia (1662), the fort was surrendered to Koxinga, but was later destroyed by a rebellion and earthquakes in the 18th century. It was rebuilt afterwards in the 19th century under Qing rule.

The fort's name derives from the Taiwanese aboriginal village recorded by the Dutch as Sakam, (Note: Other early forms of the name are Chhaccam, Sacam, Saccam, and Zaccam. Also Sakkam per Davidson (1903), Index p. 32) which has developed into the modern-day Tainan. After growth in size and trade, the Chinese called it Chhiah-kham, and surrounded it with high brick walls. It eventually became the capital of the whole island under the name of Taiwan-fu.

In addition to the site's architectural and artistic significance, its library of dictionaries and business transactions documents the Siraya language spoken by the native inhabitants of the region during Dutch rule.

The fort is up for redevelopment which will see it turned into a museum. The project is led by Taiwanese architecture studio HOU x LIN, the two partners of which both have a connection to The Netherlands. The project should be finished by 2024 in time for the celebration of the 400 year old relationship of the two countries.

== Gallery ==
Haisheng Temple of the Fort Provintia at night

Wengchang Pavilion

Haisheng Temple and the front court

Corridor of the Wengchang Pavilion

Penghu Academy of the Fort Provintia

Stairs leading to Haisheng Temple

View of Haisheng Temple from Wengchang Pavilion

== See also ==
- Fort Santo Domingo
- Ft. Zeelandia
- Cape of San Diego
- Eternal Golden Castle
- History of Taiwan
- Taiwan under Dutch rule
- Koxinga
- Siraya

== Bibliography ==
- Andrade, Tonio (2005). "Chapter 6: The Birth of Co-colonization". How Taiwan Became Chinese: Dutch, Spanish, and Han Colonization in the Seventeenth Century. Columbia University Press.
- Campbell, William (1903). "Explanatory Notes". Formosa under the Dutch: described from contemporary records, with explanatory notes and a bibliography of the island. London: Kegan Paul. OCLC 644323041.
- Davidson, James W. (1903). The Island of Formosa, Past and Present : history, people, resources, and commercial prospects : tea, camphor, sugar, gold, coal, sulphur, economical plants, and other productions. London and New York: Macmillan. OL 6931635M.

Geographic data related to Fort Provintia at OpenStreetMap
