= Nuyts =

Nuyts may refer to:

== People ==
- Pieter Nuyts (1598–1655), Dutch explorer and diplomat
- Pieter Nuyts (writer) (1640–1709), Dutch poet and playwright

== Places ==
- Nuyts Archipelago (disambiguation), places associated with the island group in South Australia
- Nuyts Land District, cadastral division of Western Australia
- Nuyts Reef, island in South Australia
  - Nuyts Reef Conservation Park, a protected area in South Australia

== See also ==
- Nuytsia (disambiguation)
- Nuytsland Nature Reserve, Western Australia
- Pieter Nuyts (disambiguation)
