= Battle of San Salvador (1641) =

Battle of San Salvador

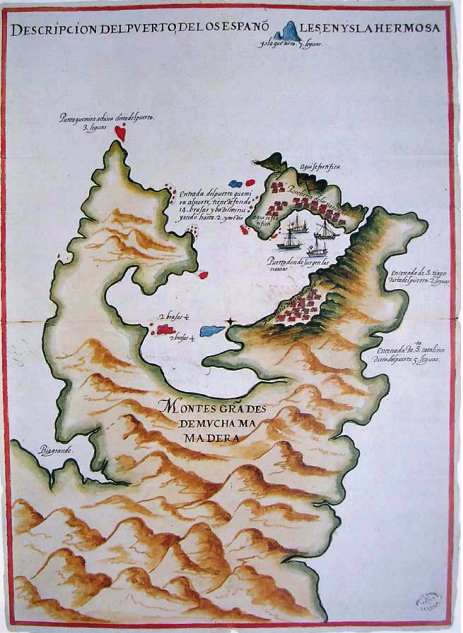
- Spanish Colony of Keelung and Tamsui
Date	August 1641
Location	Keelung, Taiwan 25°8′N 121°44′E
Result	Tactical victory for the Spanish; strategic victory for the Dutch; the Danshui fall to the Dutch sphere of influence

Belligerents
Spain	Dutch Republic

Commanders and leaders
(Spanish Empire) Gonzalo Portillo	(Dutch East India Company) Paulus Traudenius

Strength
40 Spanish soldiers, 18 Kapampangan soldiers and a company of Cagayanos	205 Dutch soldiers and 500 aboriginal warriors
- Location within Taiwan

The Battle of San Salvador (1641), also known as the First Battle of San Salvador, was an expedition launched by the Dutch and their aboriginal allies in Taiwan against the Spanish in 1641.

== Background ==
As Chinese merchants brought news of the Spanish withdrawal to the Dutch, telling them that the Spanish intended to abandon Formosa altogether and were merely waiting for permission from the king. The Dutch were growing interested in northern Taiwan because they had heard reports of gold mines in the northeast and felt they could not go prospecting until the Spanish had been removed. After making contact with the aborigines of Danshui, the Dutch decided to launch their attack.

In courteous terms, the Dutch Governor Paulus Traudenius informed the Spanish governor of their intentions.

Sir,
I have the honor to communicate to you that I have received the command of a considerable naval and military force with the view of making me master by civil means or otherwise of the fortress Santissima Trinidad in the isle of Ke-lung of which your Excellency is the Governor.
In accordance with the usages of Christian nations to make known their intentions before commencing hostilities, I now summon your Excellency to surrender. If your Excellency is disposed to lend an ear to the terms of capitulation which we offer and make delivery to me of the fortress of Santissima Trinidad and other citadels, your Excellency and your troops will be treated in good faith according to the usages and customs of war, but if your Excellency feigns to be deaf to this command there will be no other remedy than recourse to arms. I hope that your Excellency will give careful consideration to the contents of this letter and avoid the useless effusion of blood, and I trust that without delay and in a few words you will make known to me your intentions.
May God protect your Excellency many years,
The Friend of your Excellency,
PAULUS TRAUDENIUS

The Spanish governor was not inclined to give in so easily and replied in kind.

Sir; I have duly received your communication of August 26th, and in response I have the honor to point out to you that as becomes a good Christian who recalls the oath he has made before his king, I cannot and will not surrender the forts demanded by your Excellency, as I and my garrison have determined to defend them. I am accustomed to find myself before great armies, and I have engaged in numerous battles in Flanders as well as other countries, and so I beg of you not to take the trouble of writing me further letters of like tenor. May each one defend himself as best he can. We are Spanish Christians and God in whom we trust is our protector.
May the Lord have mercy on you.
Written in our principal fortress San Salvador the 6th of September 1641.
GONSALO PORTILIS

== The siege ==
Location of Keelung, Taiwan

In August 1641, a Dutch expedition sailed to the Bay of Jilong to study the Spaniards' situation and, if possible, capture San Salvador. Warned by an aboriginal friend, the Spanish prepared for an attack. The Dutch soldiers landed on the shore of the bay across from the island. Since the Spanish governor had refused to allow aborigines to seek refuge in the fortress, many fled into the mountains. The Dutch brought with them some 500 northern aborigines, they entered Kimaurri without opposition. They spent the night there and the next morning climbed the hill behind the village and proceeded methodically to count the Spanish infantry by telescope, "seeing in this way everything that they wanted to." Later, even though the Dutch outnumbered the Spanish and had the support of hundreds of aborigines, the Dutch commander realized he did not have enough cannons to mount a proper siege. The Dutch disengaged and left, burning Kimaurri on the way.

== Aftermath ==
As the Spanish watched the Dutch depart, they were impressed by the number and orderliness of their enemies' aboriginal allies. "The enemy," wrote one, "convened the entire Danshui River and all the villages that are under their jurisdiction, which was a very large number of Indians, and, when from this fortress we saw them arrayed at intervals on the hills and beaches, we [realized] that they [the Indians] were an army." Indeed, on their way back from San Salvador to southwestern Taiwan, the Dutch made an agreement with the "natives of Danshui," promising them protection against their enemies. Not long afterward, emissaries from Danshui went to the Dutch headquarters in Zeelandia and, according to Dutch sources, officially handed over their lands to the Dutch, in the same manner that the villages of the southwestern plains had done in the 1630s. The balance of power had changed in Formosa. Without help from Manila, the Spanish had little means of withstanding a Dutch attack, which is exactly what happened in the Second Battle of San Salvador.

The Spanish celebrated the departure of the Dutch with a procession of thanksgiving. But the Dutch had already delivered a major blow to Spanish authority in Taiwan. By making peace with the aborigines in Danshui, the Dutch turned an area that had once been a central part of the Pax Hispanica into enemy territory for the Spanish. Moreover, by burning Kimaurri and mocking the Spanish beneath their very fortress, the Dutch had denigrated the Spaniards' military reputation, an attribute most necessary in the warlike world of seventeenth-century Formosa. The Spanish governor complained to Governor-General Corcuera that he could no longer persuade the aborigines to cooperate even in small matters: "They are traitors and are risen against us, being of a nature that they only help those who vanquish them."

== See also ==
- Spanish Formosa
- Dutch Formosa
- Spanish East Indies
- Category:History of the Philippines (1565–1898), Spanish colonial period in the Philippines
