= Robert Junius =

Dutch missionary (1606–1655)

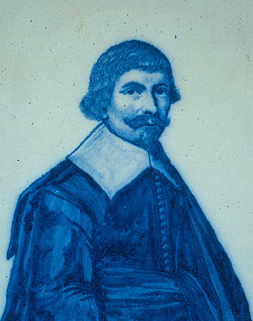
- Portrait of Junius by Junius on Delftware
- Born: 1606; Rotterdam
- Died: August 28, 1655; Amsterdam
- Occupation: Missionary
- Title: Reverend

Robert Junius, also recorded as Robertus Junius (born Robert de Jonghe; 1606 in Rotterdam – 22 August 1655 in Amsterdam) was a Dutch Reformed Church missionary to Taiwan (then known as Formosa) from 1629 to 1643. Along with Antonius Hambroek and Joannes Cruyf, he was among the longest-serving missionaries of the Dutch colonial era in Formosa.

== Mission in Formosa ==
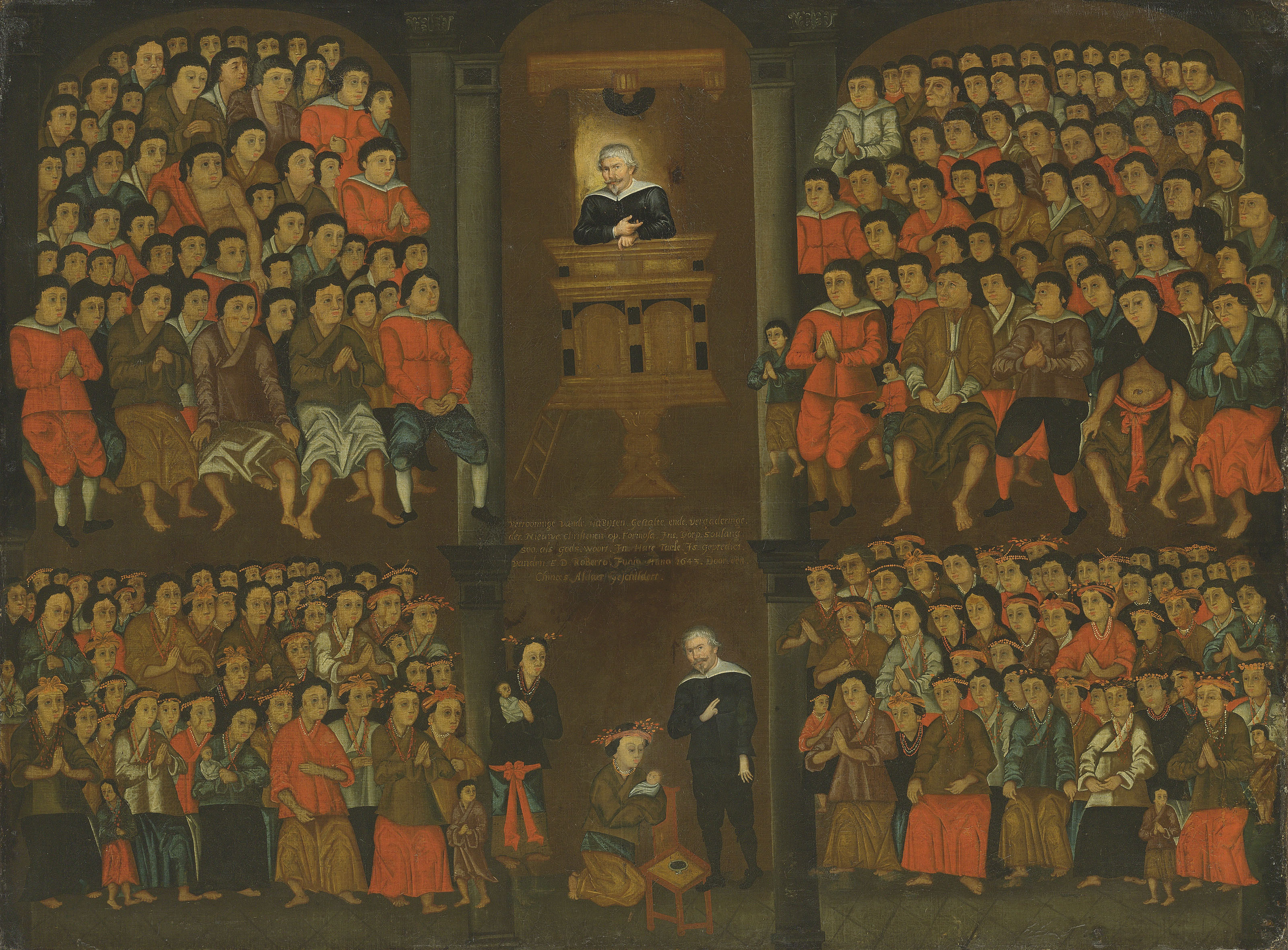
Junius baptising the new Christians (aboriginal Taiwanese) at Formosa. Oil on canvas, dated 1643

On arriving in Formosa, Junius took up residence in the village of Sakam, in the vicinity of Fort Provintia in present-day Tainan City.

Described as more energetic than his contemporary, George Candidius, Junius was involved in the pacification of Taiwanese aborigines following the slaughter of sixty Dutch people by the natives of Mattau. This took the form of a short punitive war against the offending villages by Dutch forces, resulting in the killing of "a few dozen" aborigines and a Pax Hollandica which followed after the recalcitrant tribes had been cowed. Following this campaign, Junius continually urged the authorities in Batavia to send more clergymen to Formosa to assist in the instruction and conversion of the now amenable natives, something in which he was supported by the governor of the time, Hans Putmans. However, he was ultimately disappointed by the response from the colonial administrative centre.

In 1636, Junius established the first school in Formosa, teaching a class of 70 boys to write their mother tongue in roman letters.

In 1641, he was called to Batavia to report to the Consistory (the religious administrative body for Asia), and asked whether he would like to continue his service in Formosa. He agreed to return for two years, provided that

"arrangements were made to have his salary increased, and on condition that his brethren would write to Governor Traudenius about him, as that gentleman had given him some trouble."

These requests were agreed upon, and Junius returned to Formosa until late 1643.

The numbers of baptisms under Junius' authority were impressive, even with Junius' work confined to the few villages around the Dutch strongholds of Fort Zeelandia and Fort Provintia. One commentator remarks that

"At the end of thirteen years he could report that one thousand and seventy people had been baptized at a single station, Soulang, 'and a proportionate number at the other villages,' of which he names five".

== Return to Holland ==
On December 14, 1643, Junius again went to Batavia at the end of his commission. The Consistory again requested him to return to Formosa to continue his ministry, but this time Junius declined and decided instead to go back to his homeland, Holland. He married in 1645 in Delft, lived on Koornmarkt until 1653 when he accepted a post in Amsterdam. He died of the plague in Amsterdam in 1655.

== Various ==
- Junius was related to the orientalist Philippus Baldaeus and Isaac Junius, a painter of Delftware.
- The American Antiquarian Society holds the following volume: Of the conversion of five thousand and nine hundred East-Indians, in the Isle Formosa, neere China, to the profession of the true God, in Jesus Christ; by meanes of M. Ro: Junius, a minister lately in Delft in Holland; Related by his good friend, M. C. Sibellius, Pastor in Deventer there, in a Latine letter; translated to further the faith and joy of many here, by H. Jessei, a servant of Jesus Christ by the author Caspar Sibelius.
- A portrait of Junius (48 years old) after Anthonie Palamedesz.

== Sources ==
- Davidson, James W. (1903). The Island of Formosa, Past and Present : history, people, resources, and commercial prospects : tea, camphor, sugar, gold, coal, sulphur, economical plants, and other productions. London and New York: Macmillan. OL 6931635M.
- Valentijn, François (1903) [First published 1724 in Oud en Nieuw Oost-Indiën]. "Religion in the Island". In Campbell, William (ed.). Formosa under the Dutch: described from contemporary records, with explanatory notes and a bibliography of the island. London: Kegan Paul. pp. 75–86. LCCN 04007338.
- Han Cheung (20 November 2022). "Taiwan in Time: Bringing down Mattau". Taipei Times.
