= Pieter Nuyts (disambiguation) =

Pieter Nuyts may refer to:

- Pieter Nuyts (1598–1655), Dutch explorer, diplomat, and politician
- Pieter Nuyts (Governor-General) (d. 1708), Dutch Governor-General of the Dutch Gold Coast
- Pieter Nuyts (writer) (1640–1709), Dutch poet and playwright

== See also ==
- Nuyts (disambiguation)
