= Nicolaas Verburg =

10th Governor of Formosa
- In office 1649 – 24 May 1653
- Preceded by: Pieter Anthoniszoon Overtwater
- Succeeded by: Cornelis Caesar

Personal details
- Born: ca. 1620 Delft
- Died: November 1676 Delft

Nicolaes or Nicolaas Verburg (also Verburgh, Verburch) (c. 1620, Delft – November 1676, Netherlands) was the Dutch Governor of Formosa from 1649 to 1653 and Director General of the VOC council in Batavia, Dutch East Indies, from 1668 to 1675.

Probably as a teenager, Verburg sailed with the ship Hertogenbosch as onderkoopman ("sub-merchant") from Delft. He arrived in Batavia on 20 July 1637. He worked his way up in the hierarchy of the VOC and in August 1646 is appointed director of its station in Gamron in Safavid Persia. He returns to Batavia from Persia to become Governor of Formosa, starting just 4 days later. After his governorship he leaves for Batavia on 8 December 1653 on the ship de Haas, arriving 11 January 1654. Here he becomes a regular member of the Raad van Indië. Sometime before 1662 in Batavia, he married Maria van Santen (1636–1678), the daughter of Pieter van Santen, a mayor of Delft. In 1668 he becomes the council's Director General. He holds this position until September 1675, after which he departs home after 38 years in Asia as the Admiral of a "returning fleet", sailing from November 1675 till September 1676.

Both Nicolaas and Maria died very soon after their arrival, in November 1676. They had one surviving daughter, Adriana (1662–1732), who as a 14-year-old orphan married Gerard Putmans (1641–1698), the 35-year-old son of another former governor of Formosa (Hans Putmans), in February 1677. Gerard and Adriana bought the Sion Estate near Rijswijk in 1679.

Preceded by Pieter Anthoniszoon Overtwater	VOC Governor of Formosa; 1650–1653	Succeeded by Cornelis Caesar
