= Johan van der Burg =

Dutch colonial governor (died 1640)

Johan van der Burg (Delft, ?–1640) was the Dutch governor of Formosa from 1636 to 1640. In 1627 he arrived in Batavia, married Adriana Quina. It is possible he became the brother-in-law of Hans Putmans. In 1631 he was appointed in the Council of India. In 1634 he was sent on a mission to Sultanate of Banten. Johan died in office on 11 March 1640 and was buried at Fort Zeelandia.

Political offices
Preceded by Hans Putmans	Governor of Formosa; 1636–1640	Succeeded by Paulus Traudenius
