= Gerard Frederikszoon de With =

Gerard Frederikszoon de With was the second Dutch governor of Formosa, from 1625 to 1627, succeeding Martinus Sonck.

== Bibliography ==
- Valentijn, François (1903) [First published 1724 in Oud en Nieuw Oost-Indiën]. "History of the Dutch Trade". In Campbell, William (ed.). Formosa Under the Dutch: Described from Contemporary Records, with Explanatory Notes and a Bibliography of the Island. London: Kegan Paul. pp. 25–75. LCCN 04007338.

Political offices
Preceded by Maarten Sonck	Governor of Formosa; 1625–1627	Succeeded by Pieter Nuyts
