= Nuyts Archipelago (disambiguation) =

Nuyts Archipelago is an island group in South Australia

Nuyts Archipelago may also refer:

- Nuyts Archipelago Conservation Park, a protected area in South Australia
- Nuyts Archipelago Important Bird Area, a designation associated with the Nuyts Archipelago
- Nuyts Archipelago Marine Park, a marine protected area associated with the Nuyts Archipelago
- Nuyts Archipelago Wilderness Protection Area, a protected area in South Australia

== See also ==
- Nuyts (disambiguation)
