= Nuytsia (disambiguation) =

Nuytsia is a monospecific genus containing the species Nuytsia floribunda, the Western Australian Christmas Tree.

Nuytsia may also refer to:

- Nuytsia (journal), the journal of the Western Australian Herbarium

== See also ==
- Nuyts (disambiguation)
