= Cornelis Caesar =

11th Governor of Formosa
- In office May 24, 1653 – June 30, 1656
- Preceded by: Nicolas Verburg
- Succeeded by: Frederick Coyett

Personal details
- Born: c. 1610 Goes, Netherlands
- Died: October 5, 1657 Batavia
- Children: Martinus Caesar

Cornelis Caesar (c. 1610–1657) was a Dutch merchant and Dutch East India Company official, serving as Governor of Formosa from 1653 to 1656.

== Early career ==
After joining the Dutch East India Company, Caesar arrived for his first position in Batavia in 1629. During his first spell in Asia he worked in Quinam, Hirado and finally Tayouan (the capital of Dutch Formosa), rising to Chief Merchant (opperkoopman). In 1641 he resigned his position in Formosa to take up another in Hirado, but en route the Dutch were forced to relocate their factory to the artificial island of Dejima by the Japanese government. His work took him back to Formosa, then again to Japan, where he ordered a military action on the west coast of Luzon, which at the time was under enemy (Spanish) control. In 1647 he requested leave, which was granted, and he returned to the Netherlands.

== Governor of Formosa ==
After returning to Asia in 1651, Caesar was stationed in Batavia. When Nicolas Verburg was to be recalled from Formosa in 1653 it looked as if Carel Hartsinck was set to take over as Governor of the island. However, Hartsinck's patron Governor-General Carel Reyniersz died on April 18 that year, with his successor preferring Caesar as the new Governor of Formosa. Caesar took office on May 24, becoming the 11th Dutch Governor of the colony. He served for three years, being relieved on June 30, 1656 by Frederick Coyett, who was to be the last Governor. Caesar returned to Batavia, where he died on October 5, 1657.

== Notes ==
Preceded by Nicolas Verburg	VOC Governor of Formosa; 1653–1656	Succeeded by Frederick Coyett
