= Hans Putmans =

4th Governor of Formosa
- In office 1629–1636
- Preceded by: Pieter Nuyts
- Succeeded by: Johan van der Burg

Personal details
- Born: Middelburg, Dutch Republic
- Died: 1654 Delft, Dutch Republic

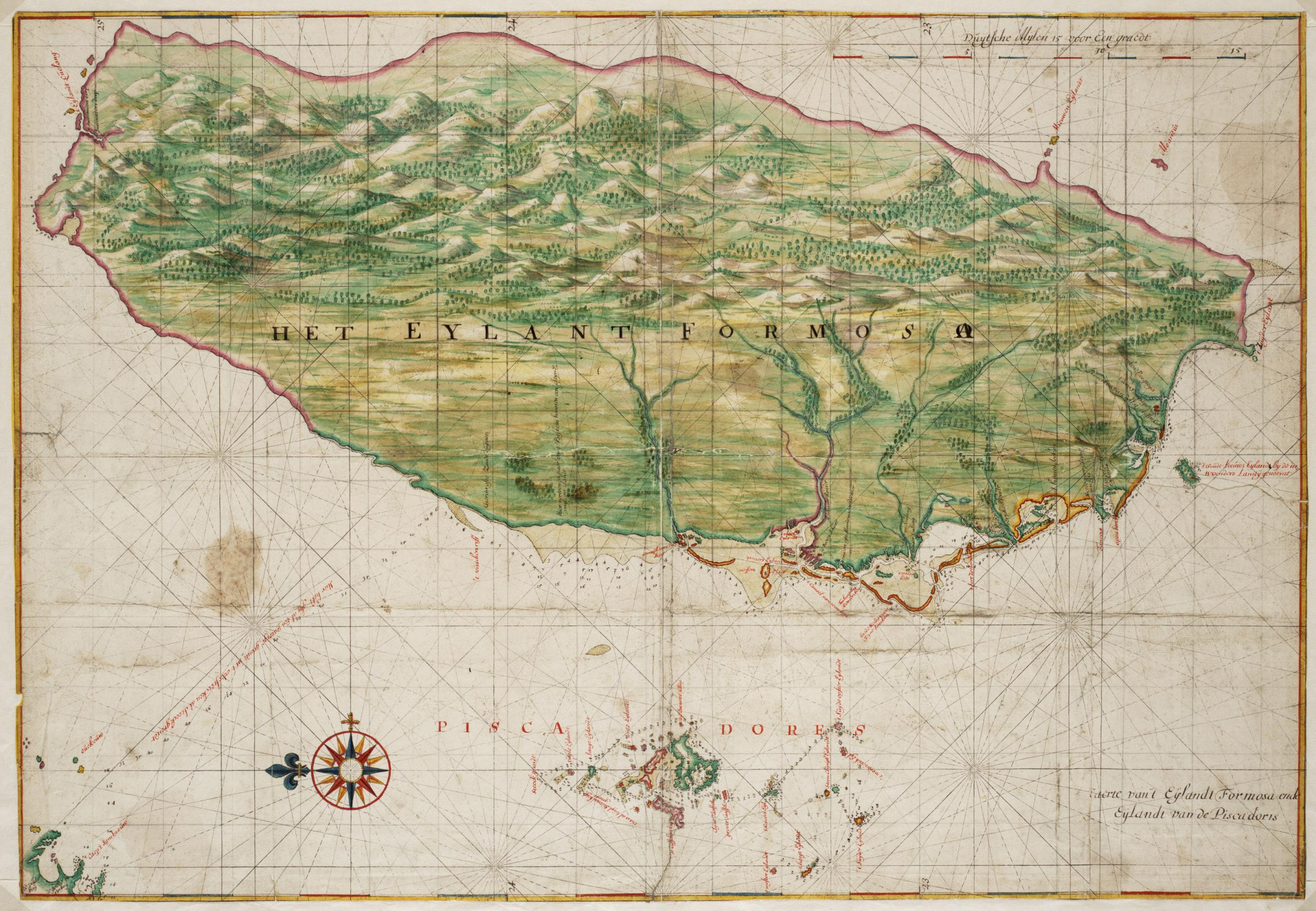
Map of the island of Formosa, Johannes Vingboons, c. 1665

Hans Putmans (? in Middelburg – 1654 in Delft) was the Dutch governor of Formosa from 1629 to 1636.

== Career in Asia ==
Born in Middelburg, Putmans came to Asia in 1621 in the service of the Dutch East India Company. Over the first three years of his career, he was stationed in Siam, Cambodia, Patani, Sumatra's west coast and Java's north east coast. In 1624, he came to Batavia; four years later he became the president of the college of Aldermen and the overseer of the Chinese citizens.

== Governor of Formosa ==
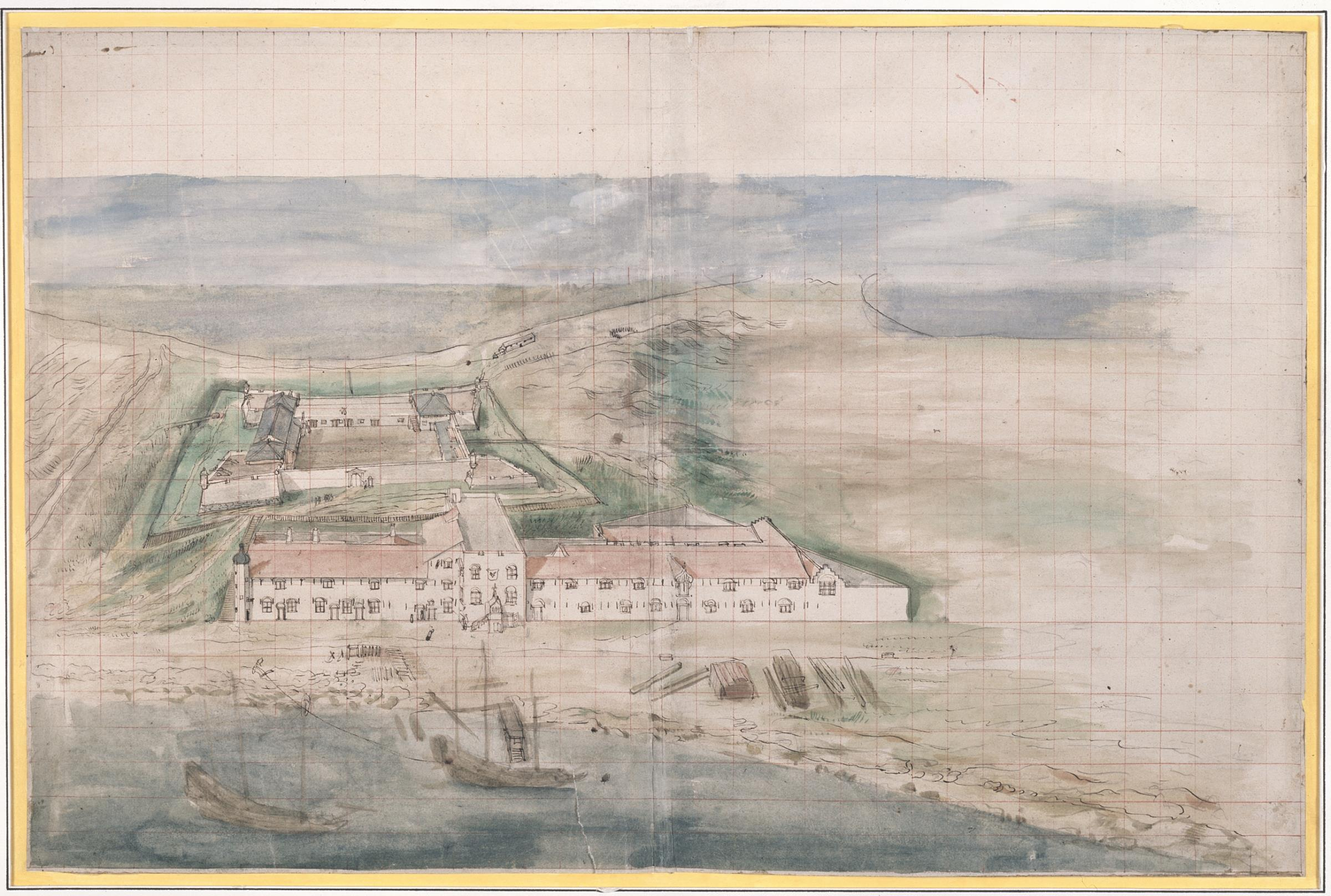
Fort Zeelandia, the seat of the governor of Formosa and his Council, as it would have appeared around 1635. Drawing by Johannes Vingboons, in all likelihood based on an earlier drawing by David de Solemne.

In 1629, he became the fourth governor of Formosa, present-day Taiwan. In 1633, he led a military campaign on the Chinese coast against the Chinese admiral Zheng Zhilong. In addition to Dutch vessels, Putmans commanded a great number of Chinese pirate vessels which he hired for the campaign. In July of that year, in a surprise attack near the island of Gulangyu, near Xiamen, he managed to destroy the fleet that Zheng Zhilong was building there. On 22 October, however, Putmans' fleet was defeated at the Battle of Liaoluo Bay, where Zheng Zhilong destroyed three Dutch East Indiamen with fireships and captured another, putting the remainder of the Dutch fleet to flight.

Defeated in the battle, Putmans turned his attention to agriculture, establishing a policy of attracting settlers from mainland China to Formosa, in order to cultivate rice and sugar on the fertile plains on the west side of the island. In time, this policy would become very successful.

== Return to the Netherlands ==
In December 1636, Putmans returned to the Dutch Republic and, after an apparent spell in Amsterdam, settled in Delft in 1638, where he would live until his death in 1654.

Political offices
Preceded by Pieter Nuyts	Governor of Formosa; 1629–1636	Succeeded by Johan van der Burg
