= Nuyts Reef Conservation Park =

Protected area in South Australia

- IUCN category Ia (strict nature reserve)
- Location within South Australia
- Location: South Australia
- Nearest city: Fowlers Bay
- Coordinates: 32°6′43″S 132°9′6″E
- Area: 47 ha (120 acres)
- Established: 16 March 1967
- Governing body: Department for Environment and Water

Nuyts Reef Conservation Park is a protected area in the Australian state of South Australia associated with Nuyts Reef, which is located off the state's west coast in the Great Australian Bight about 29 kilometres (18 miles) west south-west of Fowlers Bay.

The land forming the conservation park was declared a Fauna Conservation Reserve on 16 March 1967. This was reconstituted as Nuyts Reef Conservation Park on 27 April 1972 under the National Parks and Wildlife Act 1972 to "conserve Australian sea lion breeding habitat". On 19 December 1991, additional land was added to the conservation park to extend protection over land located between high tide and low tide. As of 2018, it covered an area of 47 hectares (120 acres).

In 1980, the conservation park was described as follows:

A group of five small reefs supporting an Australian sea lion colony and providing breeding habitat for seabirds... Five small granite reefs and rocks, some of which are swept by storm waves. The Reefs are without vegetative cover... Isolation and the absence of introduced species have ensured habitat preservation.

The conservation park including its marine zone is classified as an International Union for Conservation of Nature (IUCN) Category Ia protected area. In 1980, it was listed on the now-defunct Register of the National Estate.
