= Pieter Nuyts (writer) =

Dutch poet and dramatist

- Born: 1640; Middelburg, the Dutch Republic
- Died: March 1709; Etten, the Netherlands
- Occupations: Poet and dramatist
- Spouse: Petronilla Bernaige
- Writing career
- Notable works: Admetus en Alcestis; De Bredaasche Klio; Beschryving van Etten, Leur en Sprundel

Pieter Nuyts (1640 – buried 30 March 1709) was a Dutch poet and dramatist. The youngest son of the third Governor of Formosa (also called Pieter Nuyts), the younger Pieter was born into a comfortable situation, probably in Middelburg, before his family moved to the city of Hulst, where his father became mayor.

He authored several books of poetry and plays, including Admetus en Alcestis, a tragedy and satire of Juvenalis. Other works include De Bredaasche Klio and Beschryving van Etten, Leur en Sprundel, which is still used by historians of the region around Etten today.
