= Paulus Traudenius =

Paulus Traudenius (? in Gouda – 9 July 1643 in Batavia, Dutch East Indies) was the Dutch governor of Formosa from 1640 to 1643.

Traudenius was a descendant of a family of teachers in Gouda. His grandfather, also Paulus Traudenius, was in 1573 the first rector of the local Latin school after the reformation and had Latinized his original name Trudens to Traudenius. In 1630 grandson Traudenius is registered as a merchant for the Dutch East India Company in Tayouan on Taiwan. In 1633 he became a head merchant at Quinam, but was also active along the coast of China, in the Pescadores and on Taiwan. He married twice, in April 1633 in Batavia with Elisabeth de Meester from Rotterdam, and in 1641 at Fort Zeelandia with Adriana Quina, widow of the former governor of Taiwan, Johan van der Burg. In 1643 he was recalled from Formosa to Batavia, where he soon thereafter died.

== Acts as governor ==
Two years after the Dutch established Fort Zeelandia in southern Taiwan, the Spanish responded by establishing a fort at Santissima Trinidad in 1629 and Fort Santo Domingo in 1629. By 1641 the Spanish had become such an irritant to the Dutch in the south that it was decided to take northern Taiwan from the Spanish by force. In the usual courteous terms, Traudenius informed the Spanish governor of their intentions.

Sir,
I have the honor to communicate to you that I have received the command of a considerable naval and military force with the view of making me master by civil means or otherwise of the fortress Santissima Trinidad in the isle of Ke-lung of which your Excellency is the Governor.
In accordance with the usages of Christian nations to make known their intentions before commencing hostilities, I now summon your Excellency to surrender. If your Excellency is disposed to lend an ear to the terms of capitulation which we offer and make delivery to me of the fortress of Santissima Trinidad and other citadels, your Excellency and your troops will be treated in good faith according to the usages and customs of war, but if your Excellency feigns to be deaf to this command there will be no other remedy than recourse to arms. I hope that your Excellency will give careful consideration to the contents of this letter and avoid the useless effusion of blood, and I trust that without delay and in a few words you will make known to me your intentions.
May God protect your Excellency many years,
The Friend of your Excellency,
PAULUS TRAUDENIUS

The Spanish governor was not inclined to give in so easily, and replied in kind.

Sir; I have duly received your communication of August 26th, and in response I have the honor to point out to you that as becomes a good Christian who recalls the oath he has made before his king, I cannot and will not surrender the forts demanded by your Excellency, as I and my garrison have determined to defend them. I am accustomed to find myself before great armies, and I have engaged in numerous battles in Flanders as well as other countries, and so I beg of you not to take the trouble of writing me further letters of like tenor. May each one defend himself as best he can. We are Spanish Christians and God in whom we trust is our protector.
May the Lord have mercy on you.
Written in our principal fortress San Salvador the 6th of September 1641.
GONSALO PORTILIS

Subsequently, on 24–27 November 1641, the Dutch launched an assault on the northern regions, but the Spanish positions were well-defended and the attacking troops were not able to breach the walls of the fortresses. They returned, thwarted, to Fort Zeelandia, but a second attack in 1642 was effective and the Spanish abandoned their bases on Formosa.

== Sources ==
Preceded by Johan van der Burg	VOC Governor of Formosa; 1640–1643	Succeeded by Maximilian le Maire
