= Pieter Nuyts =

Dutch explorer, diplomat and politician (1598–1655)

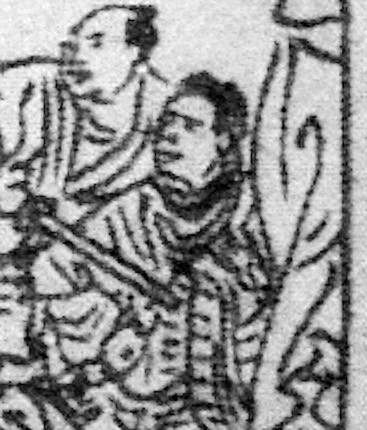
- Japanese art possibly featuring Pieter Nuyts in Taiwan in 1629

3rd Governor of Formosa
- In office 1627–1629
- Preceded by: Gerard Frederikszoon de With
- Succeeded by: Hans Putmans

Personal details
- Born: 1588 Middelburg, Dutch Republic
- Died: 11 December 1655 Hulst, Dutch Republic
- Spouses: Cornelia Jacot (m. 1620–1632); Anna van Driel (m. 1640; died 1640); Agnes Granier (m. 1649–1655)
- Children: Laurens Nuyts (c. 1622 – 1631); Pieter Nuyts (1624–1627); Anna Cornelia Nuyts (b. 1626); Elisabeth Nuyts (b. 1626); Pieter Nuyts (1640 – c. 1709)
- Education: Leiden University

Pieter Nuyts or Nuijts (1598 – 11 December 1655) was a Dutch explorer, diplomat and politician.

He was part of a landmark expedition of the Dutch East India Company in 1626–1627 which mapped the southern coast of Australia. He became the Dutch ambassador to Japan in 1627, and was appointed governor of Formosa in the same year. Later, he became a controversial figure because of his disastrous handling of official duties, coupled with rumours about private indiscretions. He was disgraced, fined and imprisoned, before being made a scapegoat to ease strained Dutch relations with the Japanese. He returned to the Dutch Republic in 1637, where he became the mayor of Hulster Ambacht and of Hulst.

Nuyts is remembered today chiefly in the place names of various points along the southern Australian coast, named for him after his voyage of 1626–1627. During the early 20th century, he was vilified in Japanese school textbooks in Taiwan as an example of a "typical arrogant western bully".

== Early life ==
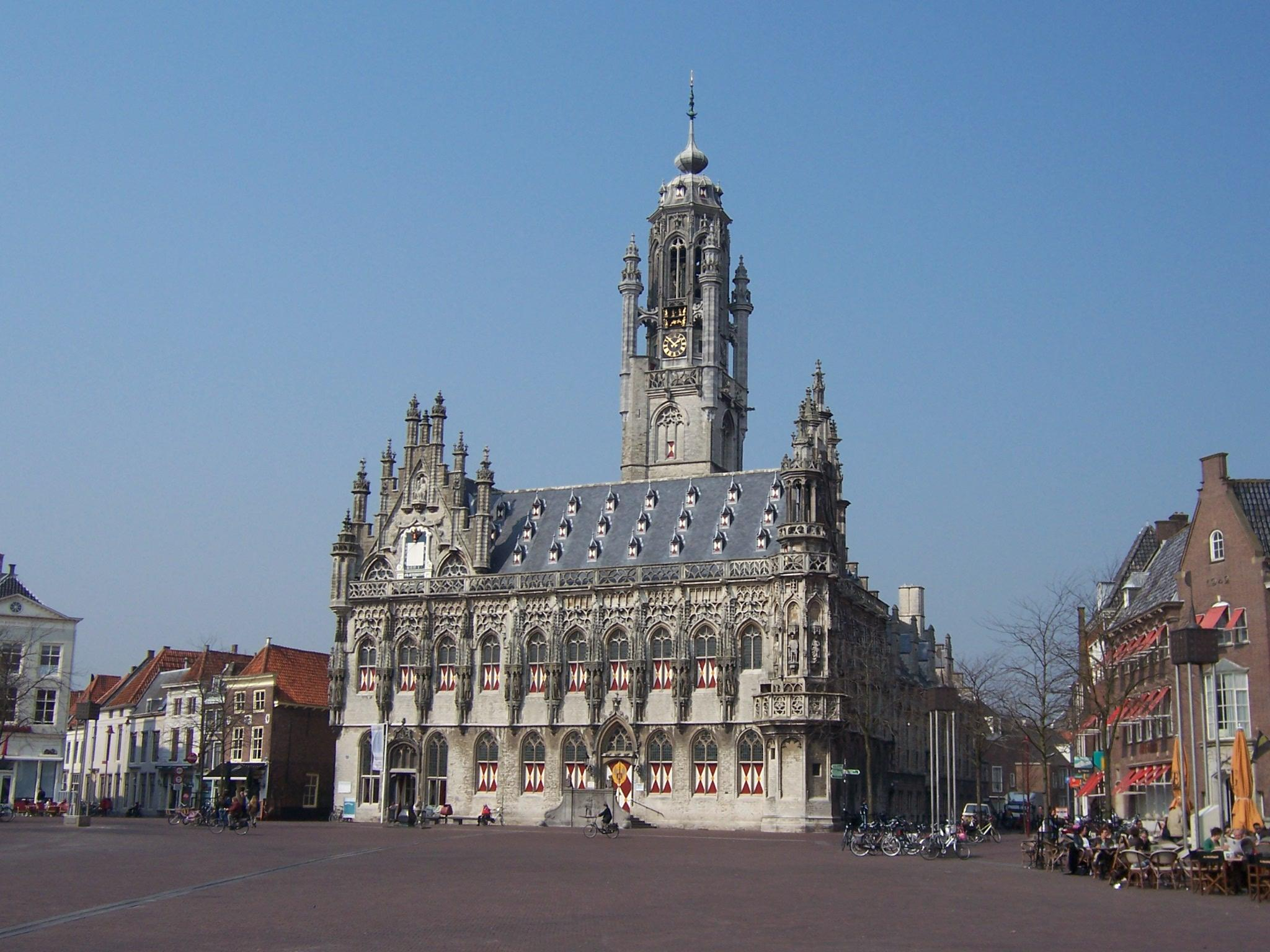
The sixteenth-century city hall of Middelburg in 2005

Pieter Nuyts was born in 1598 in the town of Middelburg in Zeeland, Dutch Republic, to Laurens Nuyts, a merchant, and his wife Elisabeth Walraents, wealthy Protestant immigrants from Antwerp. After studying at the University of Leiden and gaining a doctorate in philosophy, he returned to Middelburg to work in his father's trading company.

In 1613, Pieter Nuyts, who was staying in Leiden with the Orientalist Erpenius, is known to have met with the Moroccan envoy in the Low Countries Al-Hajari. Al-Hajari wrote for him an entry in Pieter's album amicorum stating:

The excellent young man Peter Niutsius has asked me to write something for him, so I say to him: Be obedient to the commands of the almighty God and do not worship anyone but him, and be obedient to your parents and humble towards them [...].

— Entry by Al-Hajari in Nyuts's album amicorum, Leiden, 11 September 1613.

In 1620, Pieter married Cornelia Jacot, also a child of immigrants (émigrés) from Antwerp, who was to bear four of his children: Laurens (born around 1622), Pieter (1624) and the twins Anna Cornelia and Elisabeth (1626). In 1626 he entered service with the Dutch East India Company (VOC) and was seen as one of their rising stars.

== Australian expedition ==
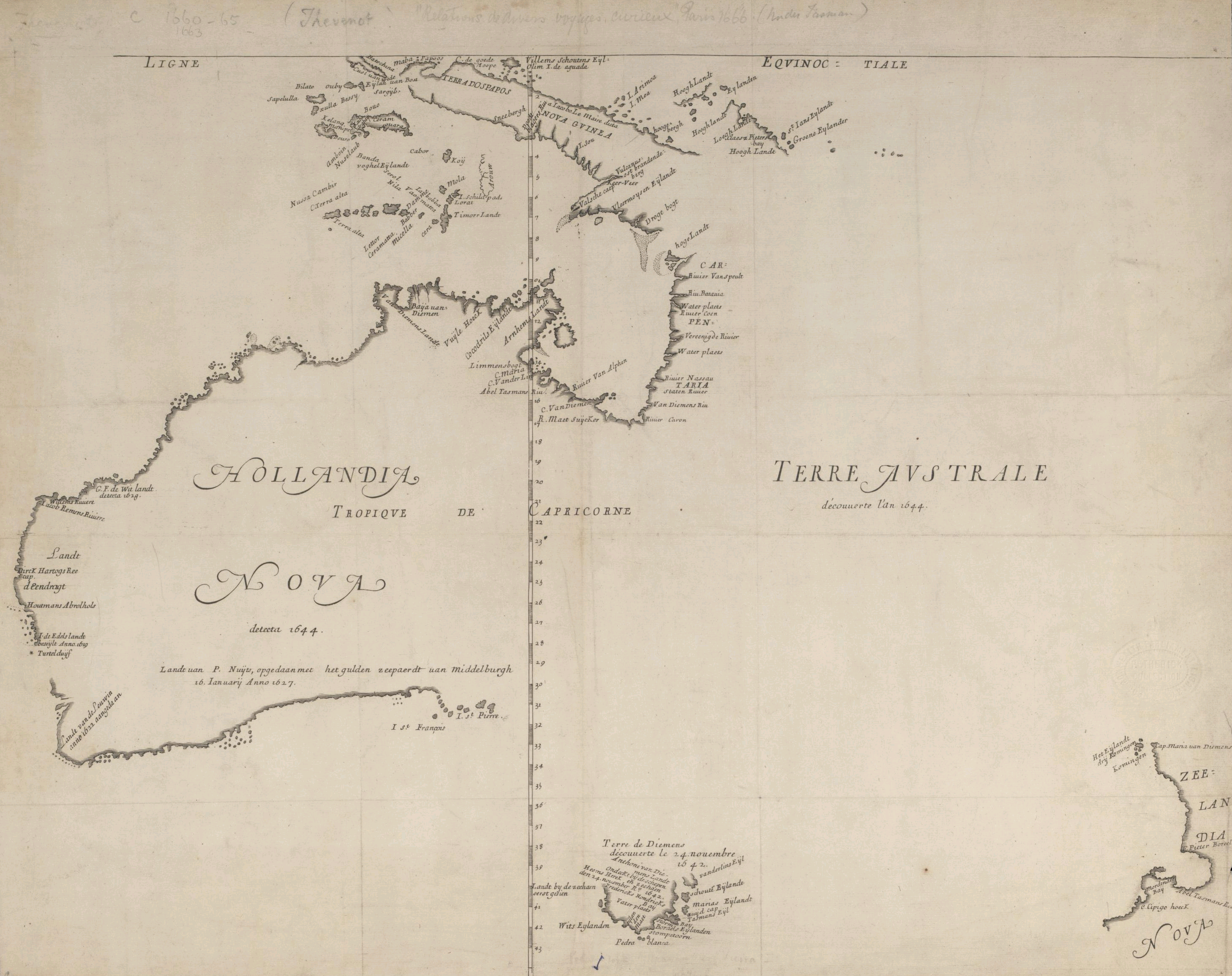
A 1644 map of Australia showing 't Landt van Pieter Nuyts towards the bottom left

On 11 May 1626 the VOC ship 't Gulden Zeepaert (lit. 'the Golden Seahorse') departed from Amsterdam with Nuyts and his eldest son Laurens aboard. Deviating from the standard route to the VOC's East Asian Batavia headquarters, the ship continued east and mapped around 1,500 kilometres (930 mi) of the southern coast of Australia from Albany, Western Australia to Ceduna, South Australia. The captain of the ship, François Thijssen, named the region 't Landt van Pieter Nuyts (lit. 'the land of Pieter Nuyts') after Nuyts, who was the highest-ranking official on the ship. Today several areas in the state of South Australia still bear his name, such as Nuyts Reef, Cape Nuyts and the Nuyts Archipelago; names given by the British navigator and cartographer Matthew Flinders. Later Nuytsia floribunda, the Western Australian Christmas Tree, was also named for him.

== Ambassador to Japan ==
On 10 May 1627, a month after completing his Australian voyage, Nuyts was simultaneously appointed both governor of Formosa (Taiwan) and ambassador to Japan for the Dutch East India Company, travelling in this capacity to the court of the shōgun Tokugawa Iemitsu, ruler of Japan. At the same time Hamada Yahei, a Japanese trader based in Nagasaki with frequent business in Formosa, had taken a group of sixteen native Formosans to Japan and had them pose as rulers of Formosa. His plan was to have the Formosans grant sovereignty over Taiwan to the shōgun, while Nuyts was in Japan to assert rival Dutch claims on the island. Both embassies were refused an audience with the shōgun (the Dutch failure being variously attributed to Nuyts's "haughty demeanour and the antics of his travel companions" and "Hamada's machinations at the court").

== Governor of Formosa ==
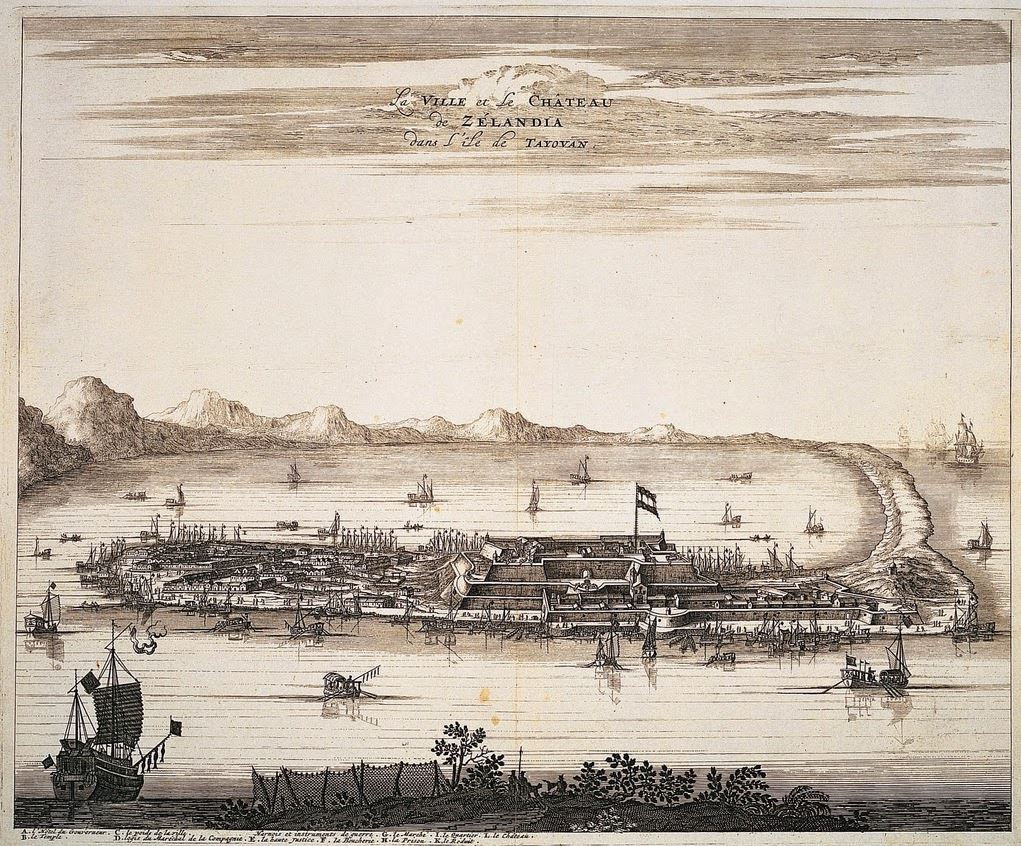
Fort Zeelandia, the governor's residence in Formosa

On returning from his unsuccessful mission to Japan, Nuyts took up his position as the third governor of Formosa, with his residence in Fort Zeelandia in Tayouan (modern-day Anping). One of his early aims was to force an opening for the Dutch to trade in China – something which had eluded them since they arrived in East Asia in the early 17th century. To further this goal, he took the Chinese trade negotiator Zheng Zhilong hostage and refused to release him until he agreed to give the Dutch trading privileges. More than thirty years later it was to be Zheng's son Koxinga who ended the reign of the Dutch on Formosa.

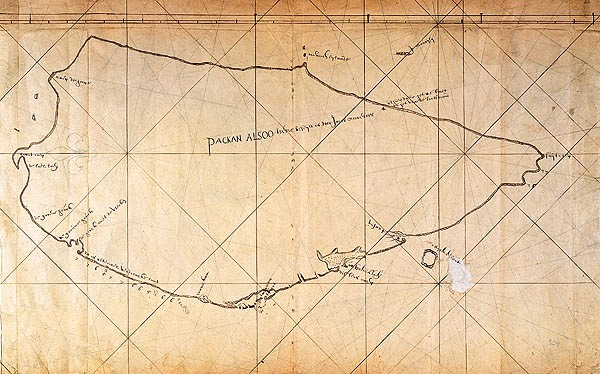
A 1625 map of Formosa

Nuyts acquired some notoriety while governor for apparently taking native women to his bed, and having a translator hide under the bed to interpret his pillow-talk. He was also accused of profiting from private trade, something which was forbidden under company rules. Some sources claim that he officially married a native Formosan woman during this time, but as he was still legally married to his first wife Cornelia, this seems unlikely.

His handling of relations with the natives of Formosa was also a cause for concern. Nuyts had a low opinion of the natives, writing that they were "a simple, ignorant people, who know neither good nor evil". In 1629 he narrowly escaped death when after being feted at the aboriginal village of Mattau, the locals took advantage of the relaxed and convivial atmosphere to slaughter sixty off-guard Dutch soldiers – Nuyts was spared by having left early to return to Zeelandia. This incident was later used as a justification for the Pacification Campaign of 1635–1636.

It was during Nuyts's tenure as governor that the Spanish established their presence on Formosa in 1629. He was greatly concerned by this development, and wrote to Batavia urgently requesting an expedition to dislodge the Spanish from their strongholds in Tamsuy and Kelang. In his letter he stressed the potential for the Spanish to interfere with Dutch activities and the trade benefits the Dutch could gain by taking the north of the island. The colonial authorities ignored his request, and took no action against the Spanish until 1641.

=== Hostage crisis ===
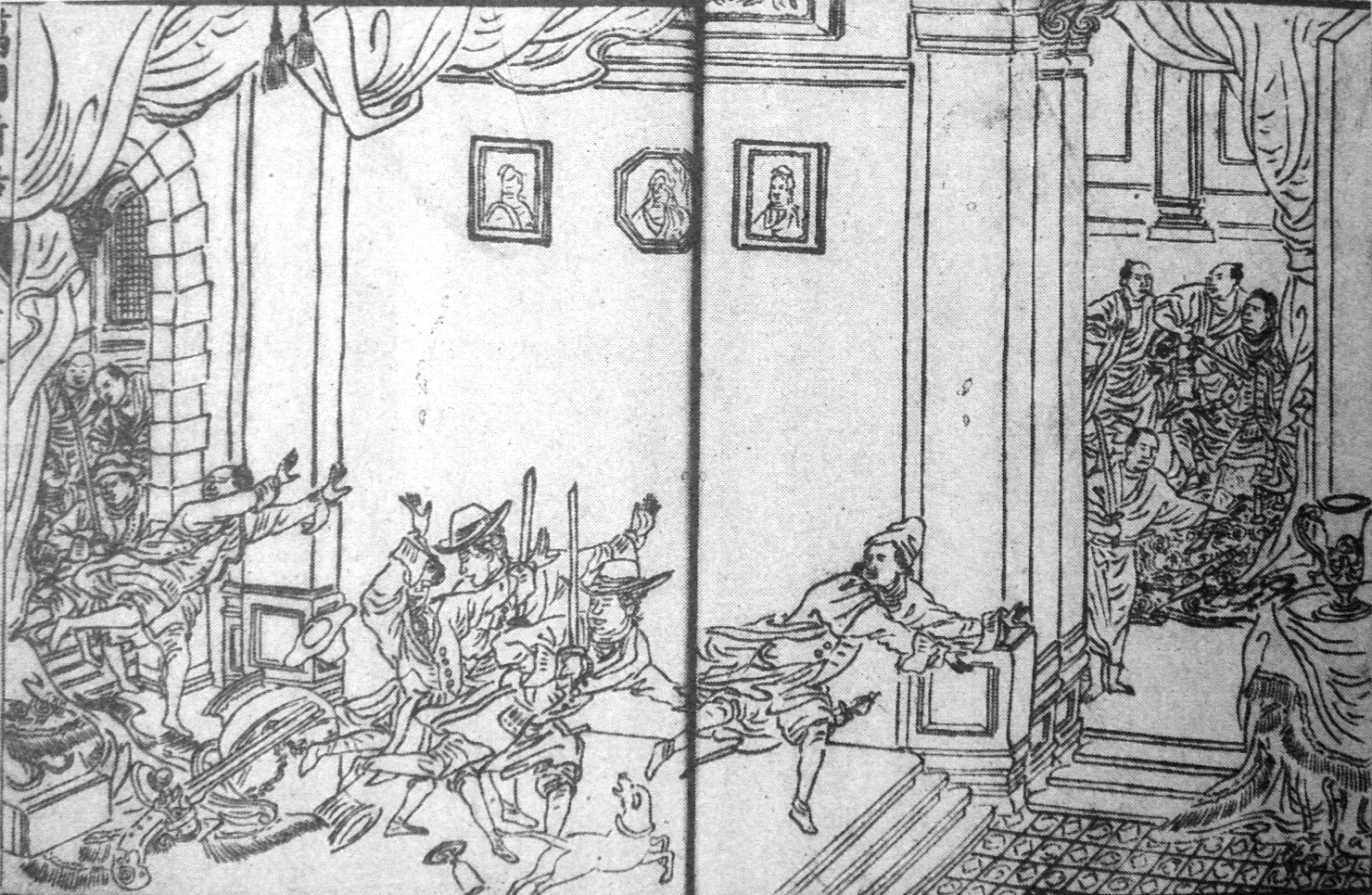
Capture of Pieter Nuyts (upper right corner) by the Japanese

The already troubled relations with Japanese merchants in Tayouan took a turn for the worse in 1628 when tensions boiled over. The merchants, who had been trading in Taiwan long before the Dutch colony was established, refused to pay Dutch tolls levied for conducting business in the area, which they saw as unfair. Nuyts exacted revenge on the same Hamada Yahei who he blamed for causing the failure of the Japanese embassy by impounding his ships and weapons until the tolls were paid. However, the Japanese were still not inclined to pay taxes, and the affair came to a head when Hamada took Nuyts hostage at knifepoint in his own office. Hamada's demands were for the return of their ships and property, and for safe passage to return to Japan. These requests were granted by the Council of Formosa (the ruling body of Dutch Formosa), and Nuyts's son Laurens was taken back to Japan as one of six Dutch hostages. Laurens died in Omura prison on 29 December 1631. During the Japanese era in Taiwan (1895–1945), school history textbooks retold the hostage-taking as portraying the Dutchman as a "typical arrogant western bully who slighted Japanese trading rights and trod on the rights of the native inhabitants".

== Extradition to Japan ==
The Dutch were very keen to resume the lucrative trade with Japan which had been choked off in the wake of the dispute between Nuyts and Hamada at the behest of the Japanese authorities in Edo. All their overtures to the Japanese court failed, until they decided to extradite Pieter Nuyts to Japan for the shōgun to punish him as he saw fit. This was an unprecedented step, and was representative of both the extreme official displeasure with Nuyts in the Dutch hierarchy and the strong desire to recommence Japanese trade. It also demonstrates the relative weakness of the Dutch when confronted by powerful East Asian states such as Japan, and recent historiography has suggested that the Dutch relied on the mercy of these states to maintain their position.

A measure of the upset he caused to the Dutch authorities can be gauged by the contents of a letter from VOC Governor-General Anthony van Diemen to VOC headquarters in Amsterdam in 1636, expressing his concern about plans to send a highly paid lawyer to Batavia to draw up a legal code:

I wonder whether these highly intelligent people do not perform more disservices than services in these quarters, witness the cases of Martinus Sonck, Pieter Nuyts, Pieter Vlack, Antonio van den Heuvel, and others, who have been used to the great disadvantage of the Company ... The Company can draw better resources from experienced, vigilant merchants with alert minds.

— Anthony van Diemen

Nuyts was held under house arrest by the Japanese from 1632 until 1636, when he was released and sent back to Batavia. During this period he passed the time by mining his collection of classical Latin texts by writers such as Cicero, Seneca, and Tacitus to write treatises on subjects such as the elephant and the Nile Delta. He also further annoyed Dutch authorities by spending lavish sums on clothing and food, things for which the VOC had to foot the bill.

Nuyts was released from captivity in 1636, most likely due to the efforts of François Caron, who knew Nuyts from serving as his interpreter during the unsuccessful Japanese embassy of 1627. On returning from Japan, Nuyts was fined by the VOC, before being dishonorably dismissed from the company and sent back to the Netherlands.

== Return to the Dutch Republic ==
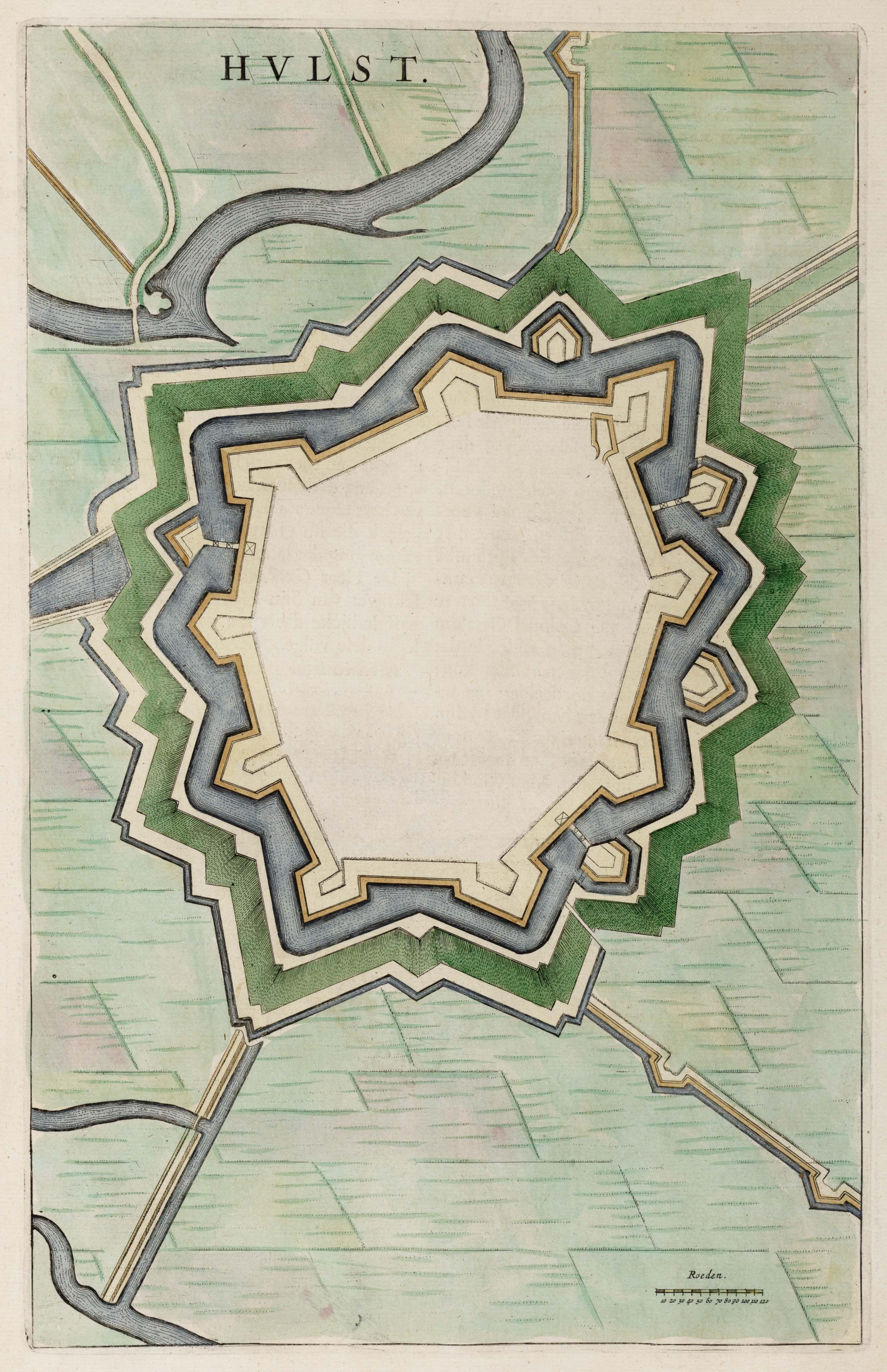
The fortification of Hulst in 1649

On returning to his home country he first went back to his city of birth Middelburg, before starting a career as a local administrator in Zeelandic Flanders, and settling in Hulst shortly after the town had been wrested from the Spanish in 1645. He eventually rose to be three times mayor of Hulster Ambacht and twice mayor of Hulst. Thanks to powerful allies in the Middelburg chamber of the VOC he was able to successfully appeal for the cancellation of the fines placed on him, and the money was returned. In 1640 he married Anna van Driel, who died that same year while giving birth to Nuyts's third son, also called Pieter. In 1649 he married his third (or perhaps fourth) and final wife, Agnes Granier, who was to outlive him.

=== Death ===
Nuyts died on 11 December 1655 and was buried in a churchyard in Hulst. The tombstone remained until 1983, when it was destroyed during renovations of the church. After his funeral it was discovered that he had collected more taxes from his estates than he had handed over to the authorities; his son Pieter eventually repaid his father's debts. It was the younger Pieter who also arranged the posthumous publication of his father's treatise Lof des Elephants, in 1670 – a single known physical copy of which still exists, in the Koninklijke Bibliotheek in The Hague.

== Bibliography ==
- Nuyts, Pieter (1670). Lof des Elephants [In Praise of the Elephant] (in Dutch). Delft: Arnold Bon. OCLC 69036658. Wikidata Q133955700. (Note: Published "at the Sign of the Quill" in 1634; that is, written out by hand, in Hirado.) (Note: Printed posthumously in 1670 by his son Pieter Nuyts junior.)

== Sources ==
- Andrade, Tonio (2005). "Chapter 3: Pax Hollandica". How Taiwan Became Chinese: Dutch, Spanish, and Han Colonization in the Seventeenth Century. Columbia University Press.
- Australian Native Plants Society (15 November 2007). "Nuytsia Floribunda". Australian Native Plants Society. Archived from the original on 11 August 2009.
- Blussé, Leonard (2003). "Bull in a China Shop: Pieter Nuyts in China and Japan (1627–1636)". In Blussé, Leonard (ed.). Around and About Dutch Formosa. Taipei: Southern Materials Center. ISBN 986-7602-00-5.
- Campbell, William (1903). Formosa Under the Dutch: Described from Contemporary Records, with Explanatory Notes and a Bibliography of the Island. Kegan Paul.
- Clements, Jonathan (2011). Coxinga and the Fall of the Ming Dynasty. The History Press. ISBN 978-0-7524-7382-6.
- Clulow, Adam (2013). The Company and the Shogun. The Dutch Encounter with Tokugawa Japan. New York: Columbia University Press. ISBN 9780231164283.
- Davidson, James W. (1903). The Island of Formosa, Past and Present: History, People, Resources, and Commercial Prospects: Tea, Camphor, Sugar, Gold, Coal, Sulphur, Economical Plants, and Other Productions. London and New York: Macmillan. OCLC 1887893. OL 6931635M.
- Heath, Byron (2005). Discovering the Great South Land. Rosenberg. ISBN 978-1-877058-31-8.
- Klaassen, Nic (2005). "Pieter Nuyts (1598–1655)". Australian Dictionary of Biography. National Centre of Biography, Australian National University. ISBN 978-0-522-84459-7. ISSN 1833-7538. OCLC 70677943.
- Leupp, Gary P. (2003). Interracial Intimacy in Japan: Western Men and Japanese Women, 1543–1900. Continuum International. ISBN 978-0-8264-6074-5.
- Shepherd, John (1995) [1993]. Statecraft and Political Economy on the Taiwan Frontier: 1600–1800. Taipei: Southern Materials Center. ISBN 957-638-311-0.
- Wiegers, Gerard (1996). "Learned Moriscos and Arabic Studies in the Netherlands, 1609–1624". In Lüdtke, Jens (ed.). Romania Arabica. Tübingen: Gunter Narr Verlag. pp. 405–417. ISBN 3823351737.

Political offices
Preceded by Gerard Frederikszoon de With	Governor of Formosa; 1627–1629	Succeeded by Hans Putmans
