= Governor of Formosa =

Dutch colonial office (1624–1662)

- Gouverneur van Formosa
- Flag of the Dutch East India Company
- Residence: Fort Zeelandia; Tayouan, Formosa
- Appointer: Governor-General of the Dutch East Indies
- Inaugural holder: Marten Sonk
- Formation: 1624

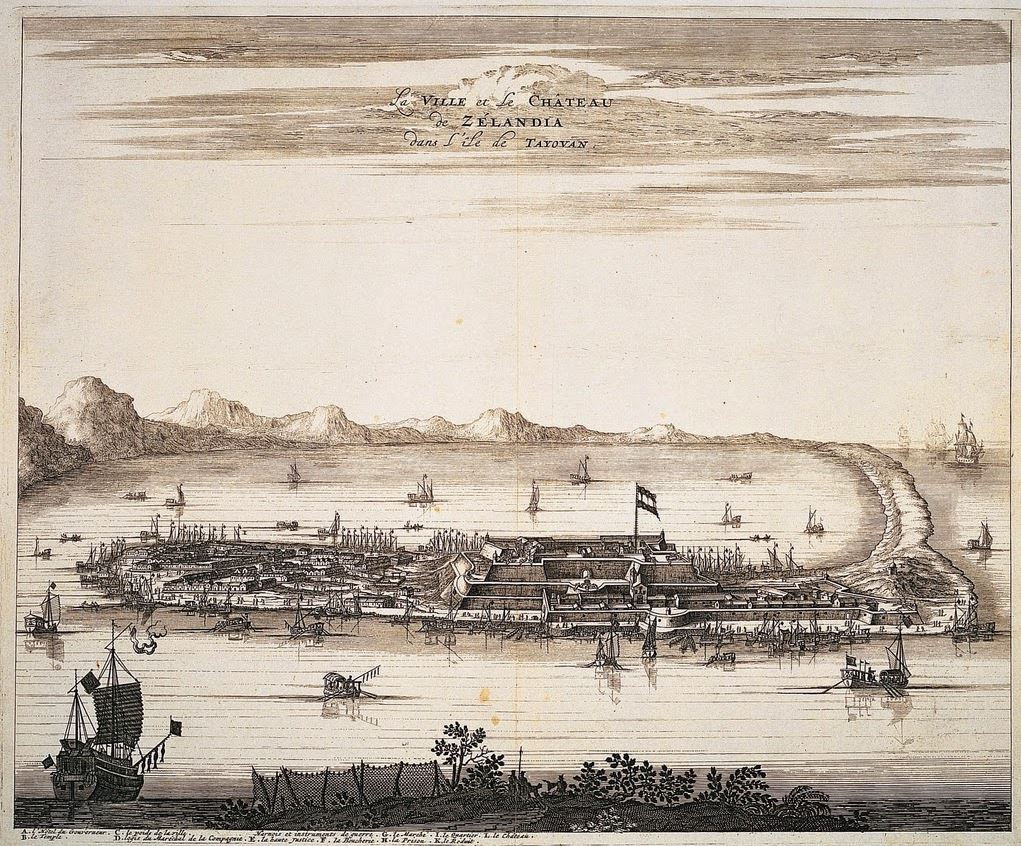
Fort Zeelandia, residence of the governors of Formosa, Taiwan.

The governor of Formosa (Dutch: gouverneur van Formosa; Chinese: 台灣長官) was the head of government of Taiwan during the Dutch colonial period, which lasted from 1624 to 1662. Appointed by the governor-general of the Dutch East Indies in Batavia (now Jakarta, Indonesia), the governor of Formosa was empowered to legislate, collect taxes, wage war and declare peace on behalf of the Dutch East India Company (VOC) and therefore by extension the Dutch state.

The governor's residence was in Fort Zeelandia on Tayouan.

== List of governors ==
There were a total of twelve governors during the Dutch colonial era. The man sometimes said to be the thirteenth, Harmen Klenck van Odessen, was appointed by VOC Governor-General Joan Maetsuycker, only to arrive off the coast of Tayouan during the Siege of Fort Zeelandia. Klenck refused to go ashore to take up his post despite being urged to by Frederick Coyett, the incumbent governor, and finally left without ever setting foot on Formosa.

№	Portrait	Name	From	Until
1		Martinus Sonck	1624	1625 (died in office)
2		Gerard Frederikszoon de With	1625	1627
3		Pieter Nuyts	1627	1629
4		Hans Putmans	1629	1636
5		Johan van der Burg	1636	1640 (died in office)
6		Paulus Traudenius	1640	1643
7		Maximilian le Maire	1643	1644
8		François Caron	1644	1646
9		Pieter Anthoniszoon Overtwater	1646	1649
10		Nicolas Verburg	1649	1653
11		Cornelis Caesar	1653	1656
12		Frederick Coyett	1656	1662

== See also ==
- Dutch Formosa
- Governor-General of Taiwan (1895–1945)
- Governor of Taiwan Province (1994–present)
