= Fort Zeelandia (Taiwan) =

Former fort in Tainan

Anping Old Fort
- 安平古堡
- Anping, Tainan, Taiwan
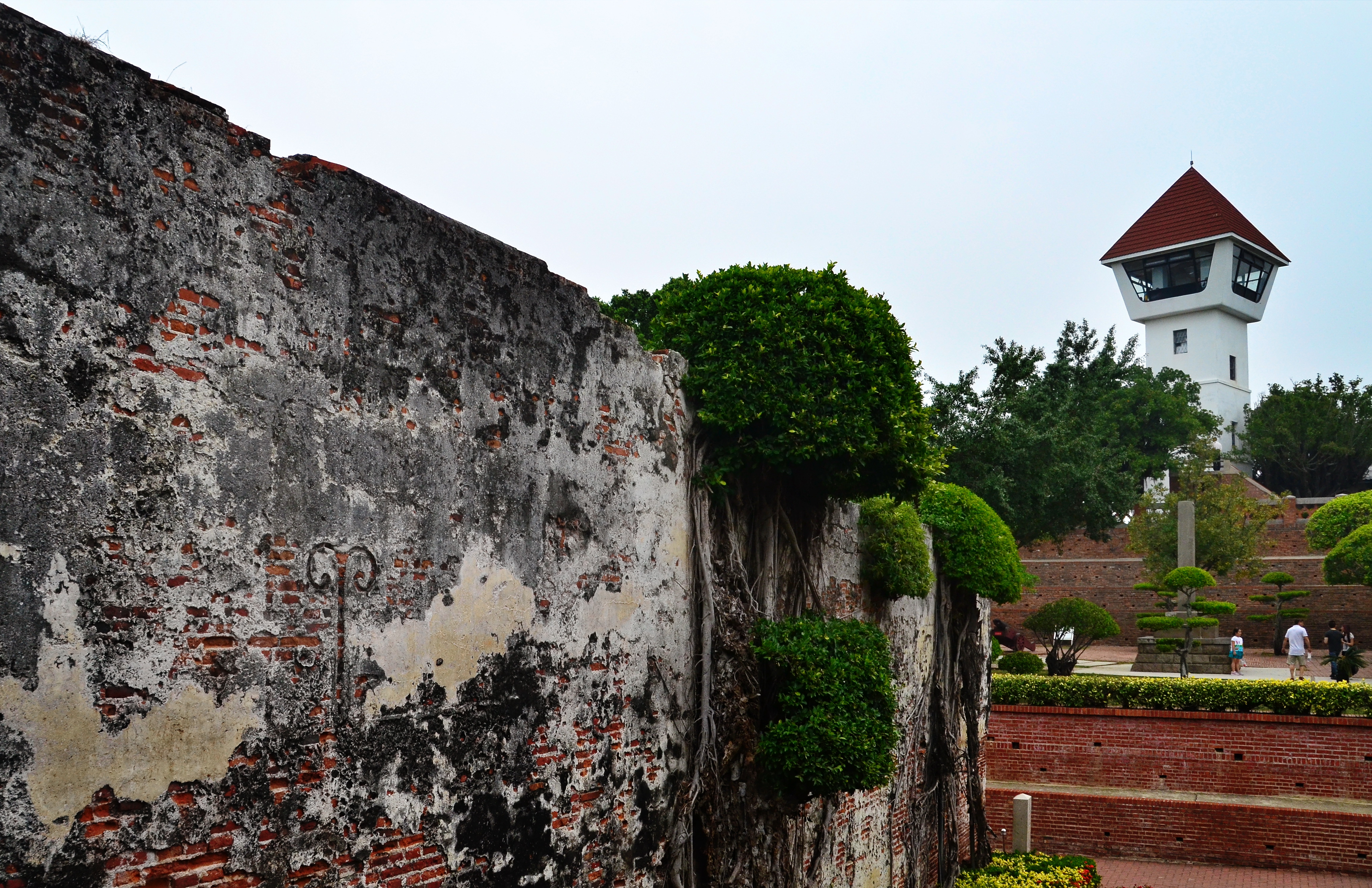
- Wall of Fort Zeelandia

Site information
- Type: Fort

Location
- Location within Tainan Location within Taiwan Location within East Asia area blank CJK
- Coordinates: 23.001747°N 120.160919°E

Site history
- Built: 1624
- In use: 1624–1662
- Materials: Brick and mortar

Fort Zeelandia (Chinese: 熱蘭遮城; pinyin: Rèlánzhē Chéng; Pe̍h-ōe-jī: Ji̍at-lân-jia Siâⁿ; Tâi-lô: Jia̍t-lân-jia-siânn) was a fortress built over ten years from 1624 to 1634 by the Dutch East India Company (VOC), in the town of Anping (now Anping District of Tainan) on Formosa, the former name of central island of Taiwan, during their 38-year rule over the western part of the island. The site had been renamed several times as Fort Orange (奧倫治城), (Note: Pe̍h-ōe-jī: Ò-lûn-tī-siâⁿ) Fort Anping (安平城) (Note: Pe̍h-ōe-jī: An-pêng-siâⁿ) and Taiwan City (臺灣城) (Note: Pe̍h-ōe-jī: Tâi-oân-siâⁿ). The current name of the site in Chinese means Anping Old Fort (Chinese: 安平古堡; Pe̍h-ōe-jī: An-pêng Kó͘-pó).

During the seventeenth century, when Europeans from many countries sailed to Asia to develop trade, Formosa became one of East Asia's most important transit sites, and Fort Zeelandia an international business center. As trade at the time depended on "military force to control the markets", the value of Formosa to the Dutch was mainly in its strategic position. "From Formosa the Spanish commerce between Manila and China, and the Portuguese commerce between Macau and Japan could by constant attacks be made so precarious that much of it would be thrown into the hands of the Dutch, while the latter's dealings with China and Japan would be subject to no interruptions."

On behalf of the VOC, ships departing from Formosa could head north to Japan, west to Fujian, or south to Vietnam, Thailand, Indonesia, Cambodia, India, Iran or Europe.

== History ==
=== Arrival and settlement of the Hollanders ===
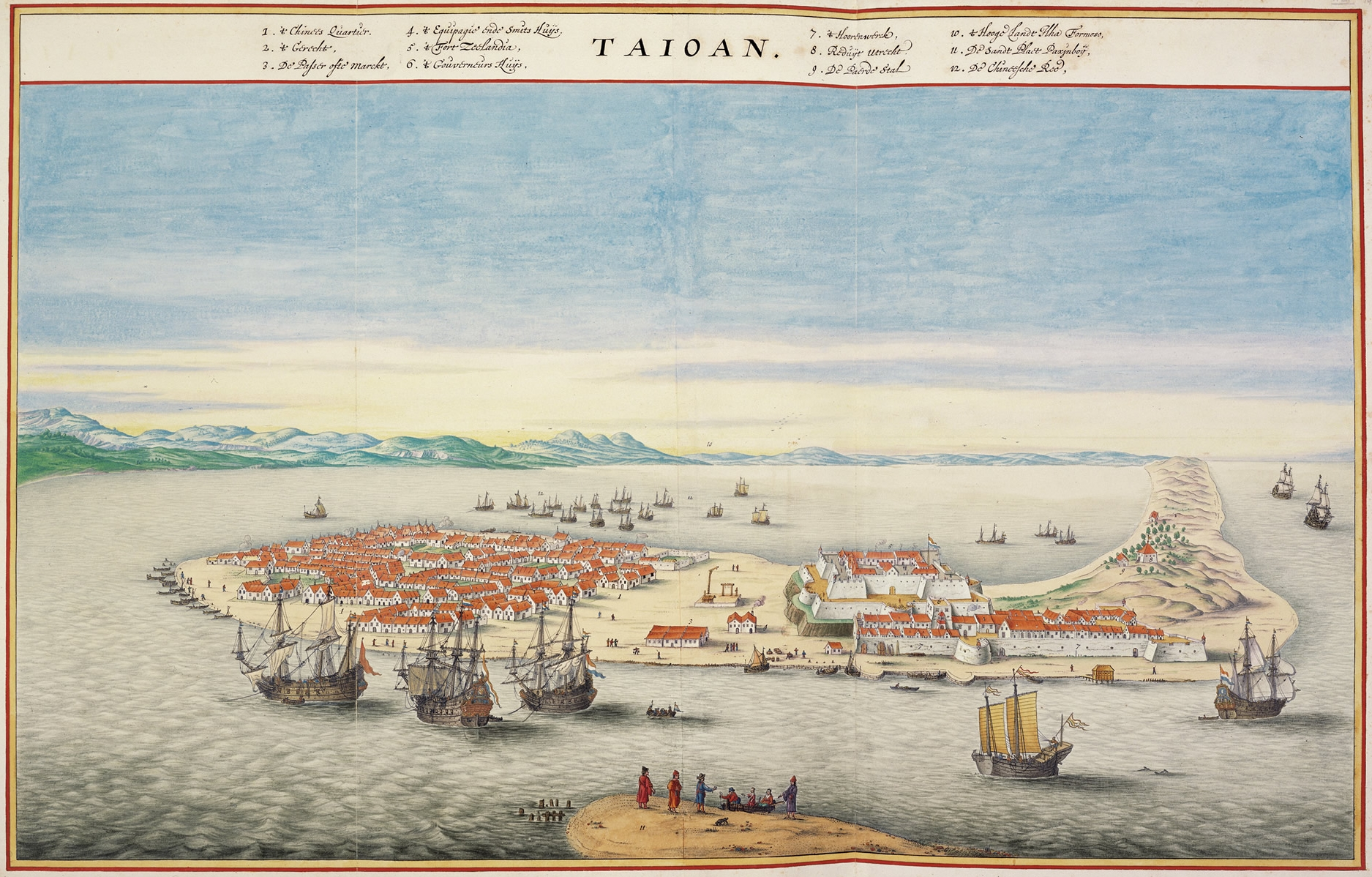
17th century watercolor of Fort Zeelandia

In August 1624, the Dutch were expelled from the Pescadores, having failed at their attempt to use military force to coerce Ming China into trading with them. Led by Martinus Sonck, who was to be the first Dutch governor of Formosa, they decided to move to Formosa to continue carrying on with trade, and after a day's journey, arrived at the settlement of Taiwan, or Tayouan. Although there were already 25,000 Chinese in the island, and their number increasing due to the war, they did not oppose the large Dutch force. Initially, trade was not as forthcoming as they had expected until, after the departure of Cornelis Reijersen (Reyerszoon) and his succession by Sonck, the Dutch and Chinese came to agreement on trade.

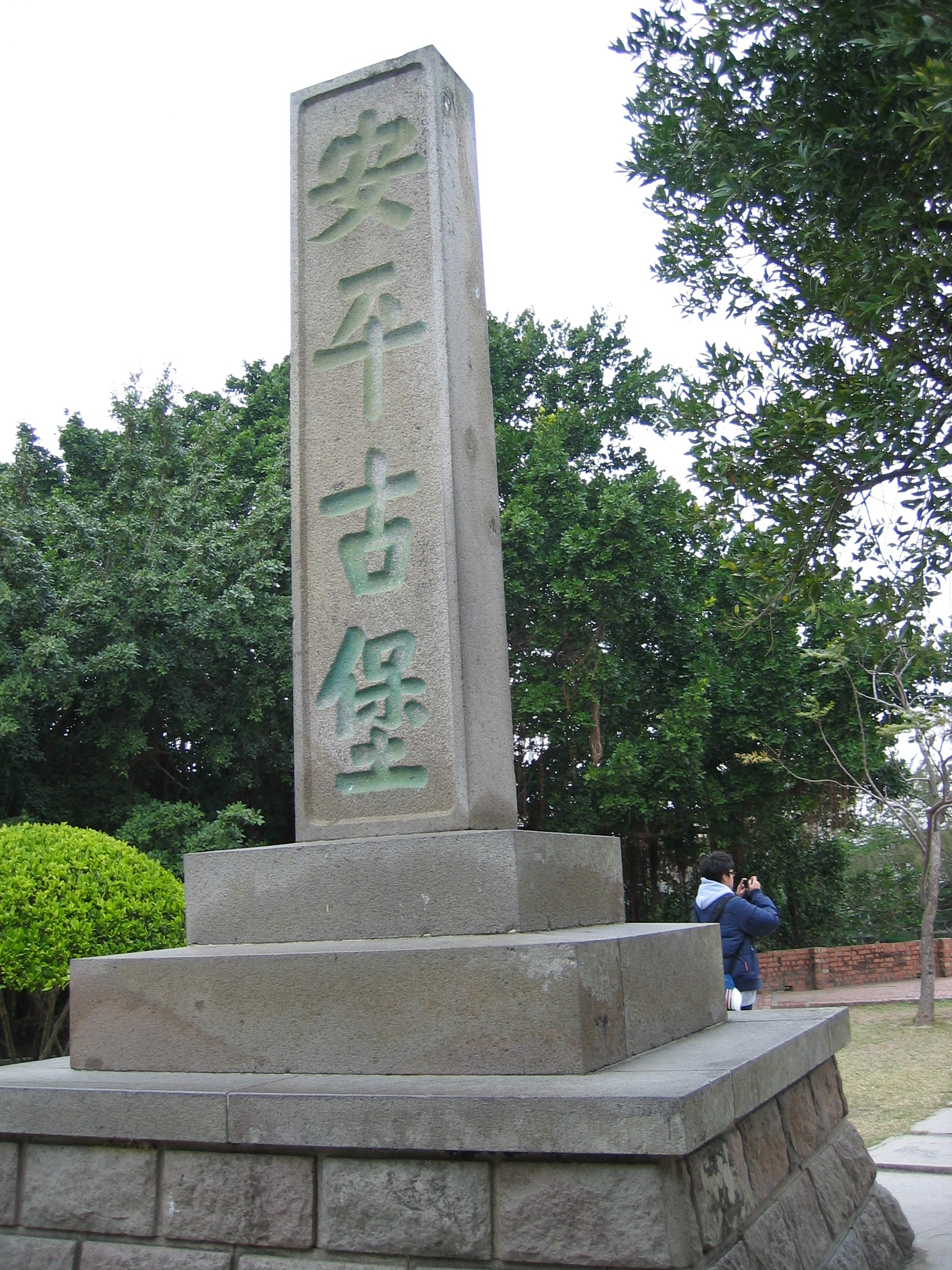
Stone monument marking "Anping Old Castle" (Fort Zeelandia)

As their first priority was to strengthen defenses, the Dutch built a temporary fort on a raised sandy bank at the entrance to Taoyuan harbor, off the coast of modern-day Anping District, Tainan. There existed a series of sandbars extended from south to north; the east side of such sandbars was known colloquially as the Tai-chiang inland sea. Four years later, the Dutch built a more permanent structure they named "Fort Zeelandia", probably after the name of the ship that Sonck arrived in. The new fort was sited on the largest sandbar to control the channel for entering the inner sea. This would allow direct access to the sea and with it, supplies and reinforcements from Batavia in event of a siege.

Another smaller fort was built later, Fort Provintia, not far from Zeelandia. Both forts were at locally high elevations, which enabled the exchange of signals between them.

While of solid construction, the fort and its siting were not so much for the purpose of defense against a major enemy as they were for defending against the islanders and for overseeing trade. In addition, the site lacked adequate supplies of fresh water, which had to be shipped from the Formosan mainland. This later proved to be a critical factor in the ousting of the Dutch by Koxinga.

=== Koxinga's conquering and the Dutch surrender ===
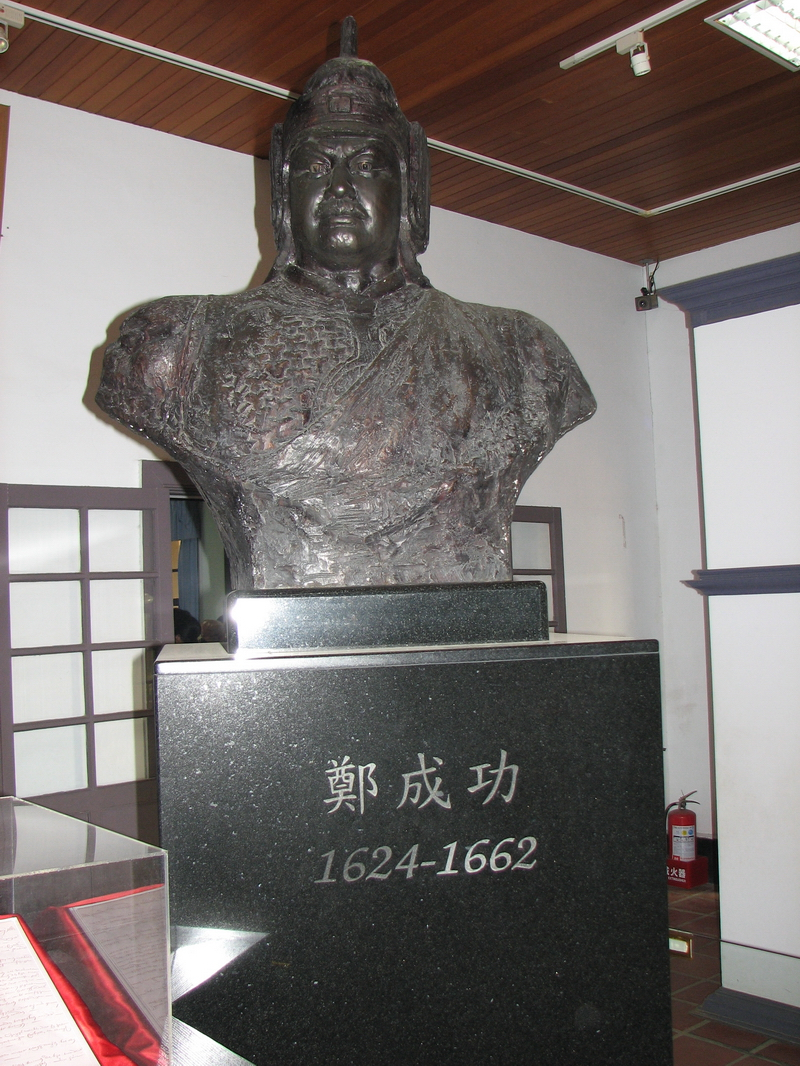
Bust of Koxinga in Fort Zeelandia Museum

On 30 April 1661, Ming dynasty-loyalist Koxinga laid siege to the fortress (defended by 2,000 Dutch soldiers) with 400 warships and 25,000 men. After nine months and the loss of 1,600 Dutch lives, the Dutch surrendered on 1 February 1662, when it became clear that no reinforcements were forthcoming from Batavia (present day Jakarta, Java, Indonesia) and when the defenders ran short of fresh water.

Under the Koxinga-Dutch Treaty (1662) signed on 1 February between Koxinga and Frederick Coyett, the Dutch governor, the Dutch surrendered the Fortress and left all goods and VOC property behind. In return, all officials, soldiers and civilians were free to leave with their personal belongings and supplies.

On 9 February, Coyett officially surrendered the fort and led the remaining Dutch forces and civilians back to Batavia by sea, ending 38 years of Dutch colonial rule.

After the siege, Koxinga took Antonius Hambroek's teenage daughter as a concubine. Other Dutch (or part Dutch) women were sold to Chinese soldiers to become their concubines.

== Features ==
=== Design and layout ===
Fort Zeelandia included an "inner fort" and an "outer fort". The inner fort was a square, three-layer construction. The lowest was for storage of ammunition and food. The second features a blank wall. The middle part of each side has a semicircular protruding barrack to strengthen the defense. Above the third story was the administrative center, including offices, garrison and church, all of them independent structures. There were walls on the periphery, with a protruding bastion on each of the four corners, armed with cannons; a watch tower was set at the southwest bastion.

The one-story outer fort was rectangular, with bastions on the northwest and southwest corners, armed with several cannons. Inside the outer fort were residences, a hospital and houses; the plaza was the commercial area.

=== Construction details ===
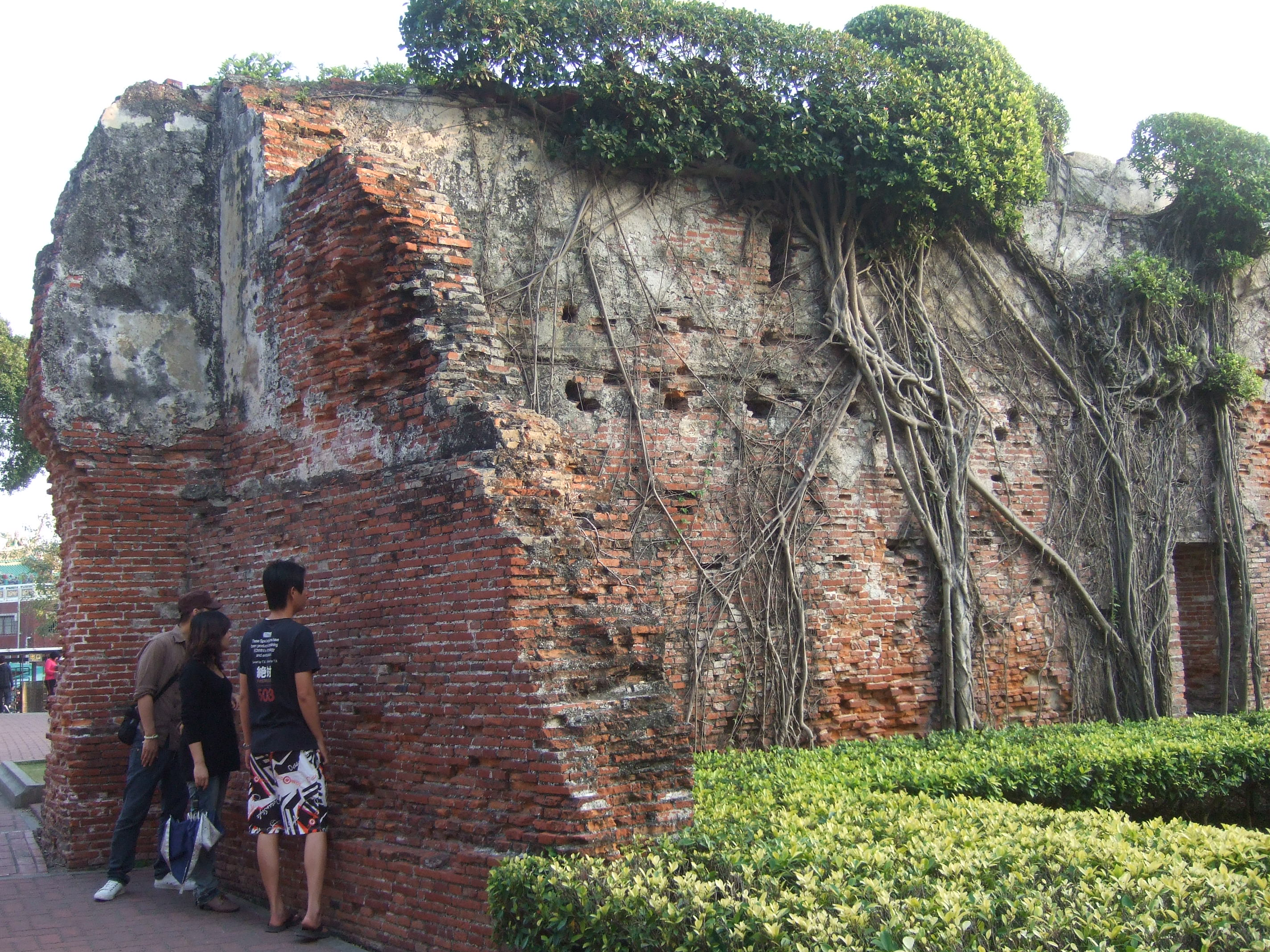
Original wall of red bricks imported from Batavia and laid by the soldiers of the Dutch East India Company

Bricks were brought from Java and the mortar consisted of a mixture of sugar, sand, ground seashells and glutinous rice. The fort was designed to be surrounded by three concentric layers of walls and its four corners were built into protruding bastions for better defense. Its layout was typical of European forts of the 17th century. Inside was the military and administration center, church, garrisons, and jailhouse; outside was the downtown. Between the fort and downtown, there were market, slaughterhouse, gallows, execution ground and city weighing station.

Dutch bond was used for laying bricks to build Fort Zeelandia. It is created by alternately laying headers and stretchers in a single course to avoid gaps. The next course is laid so that a header lies in the middle of the stretcher in the course below. The Dutch bricks should have a 10-days kilning, the texture is solid and compact, and its color is red.

== Gallery ==
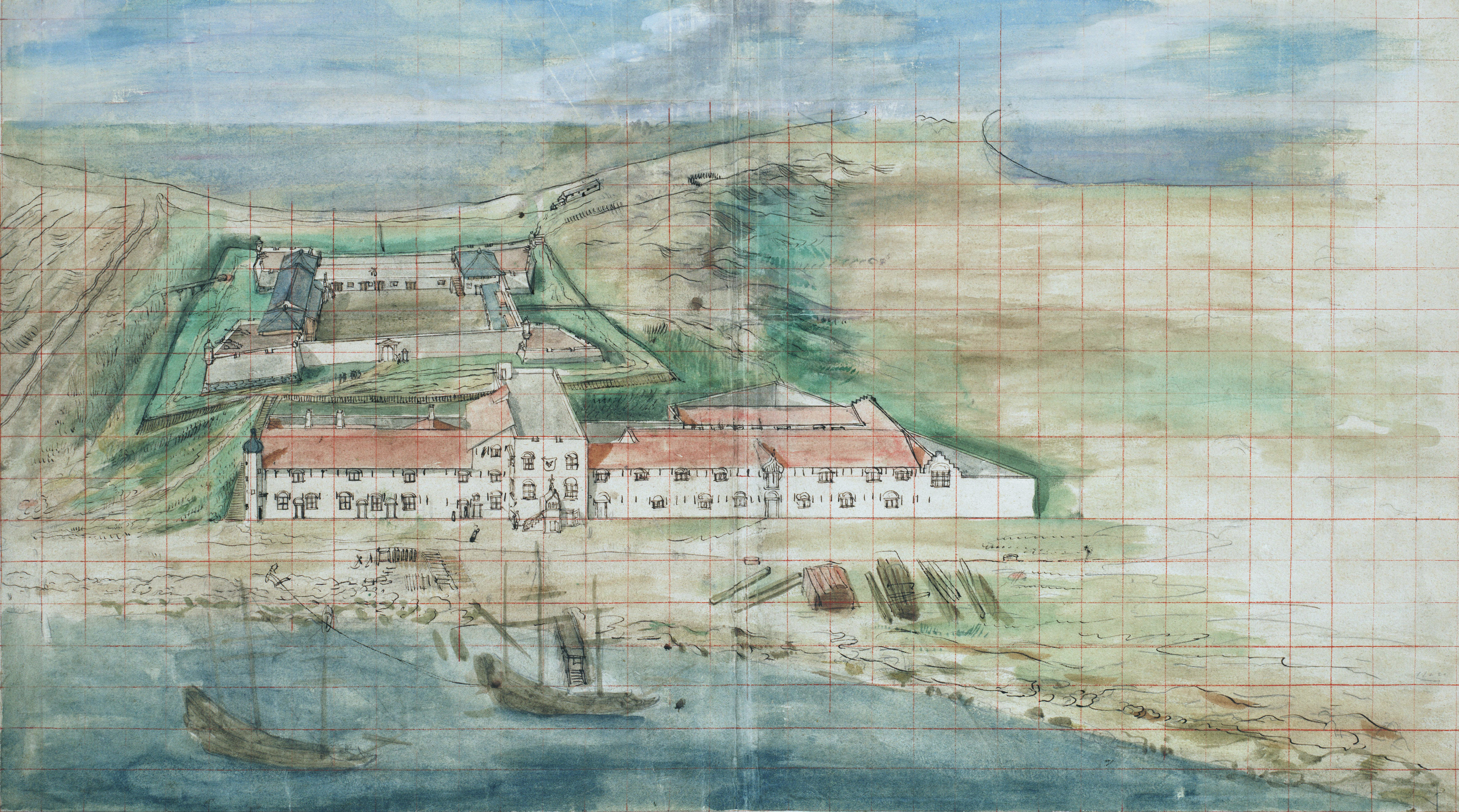
Overview of Fort Zeelandia; painting by J. Vingboons, circa 1635

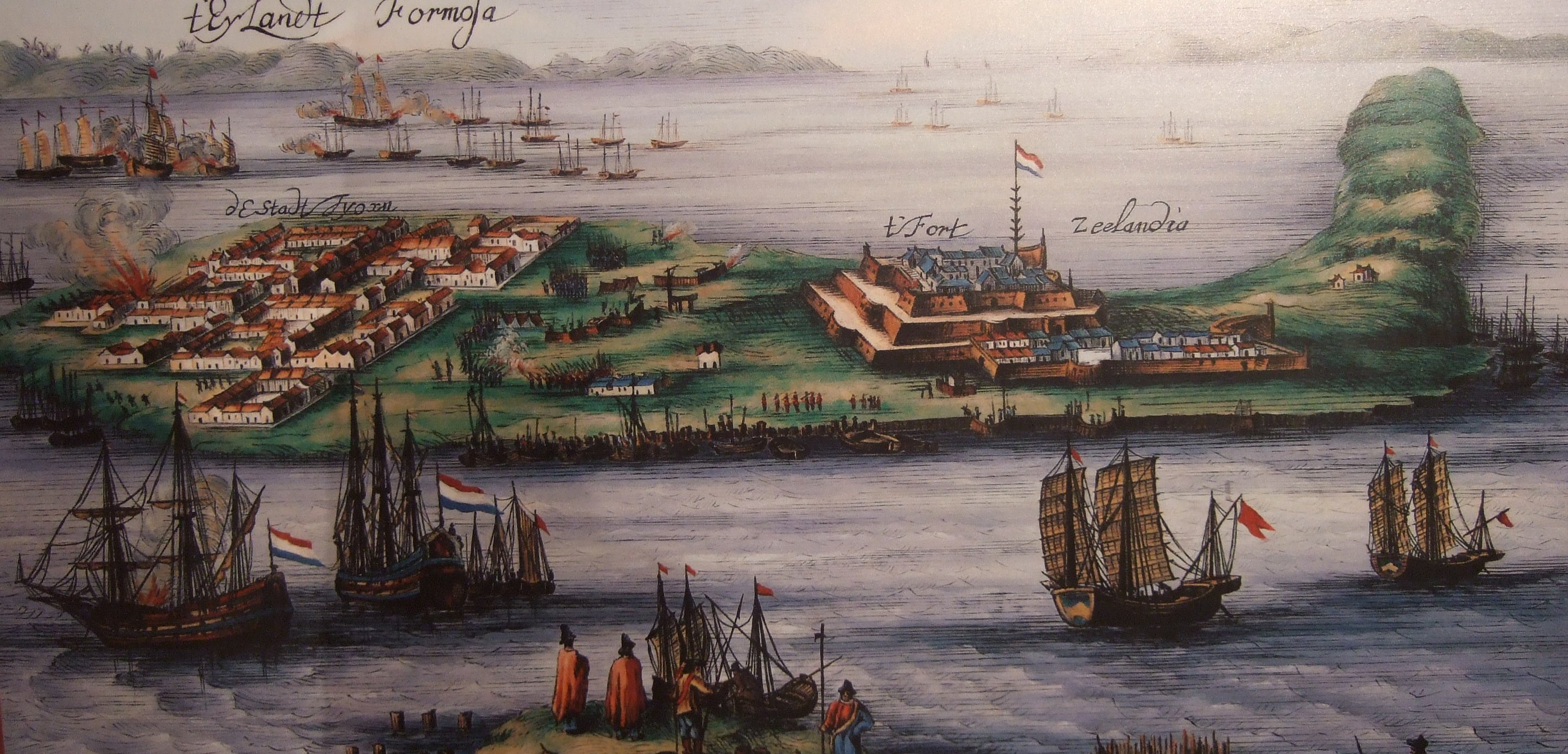
Color painting of the view of Fort Zeelandia

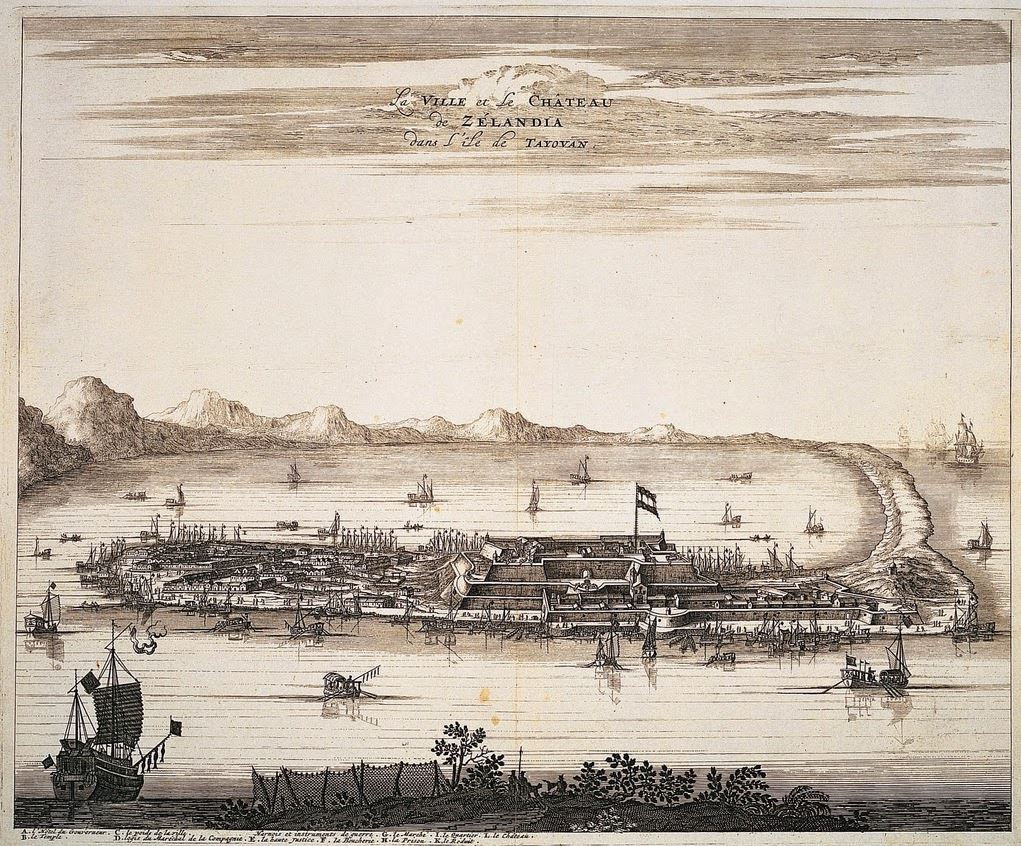
17th century print of Fort Zeelandia

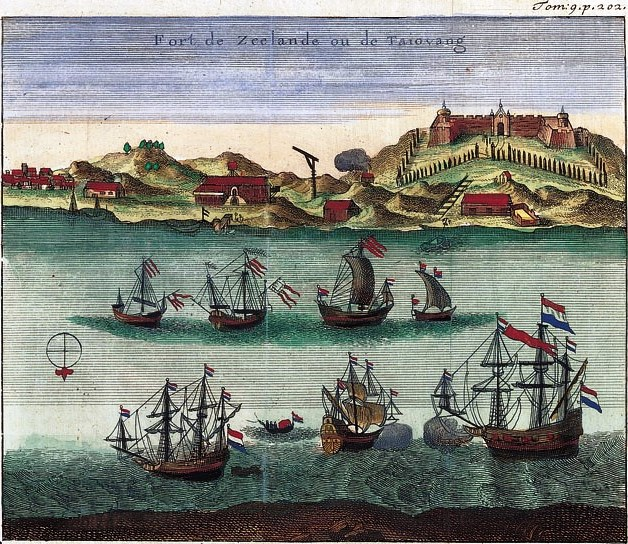
Drawing of Fort Zeelandia

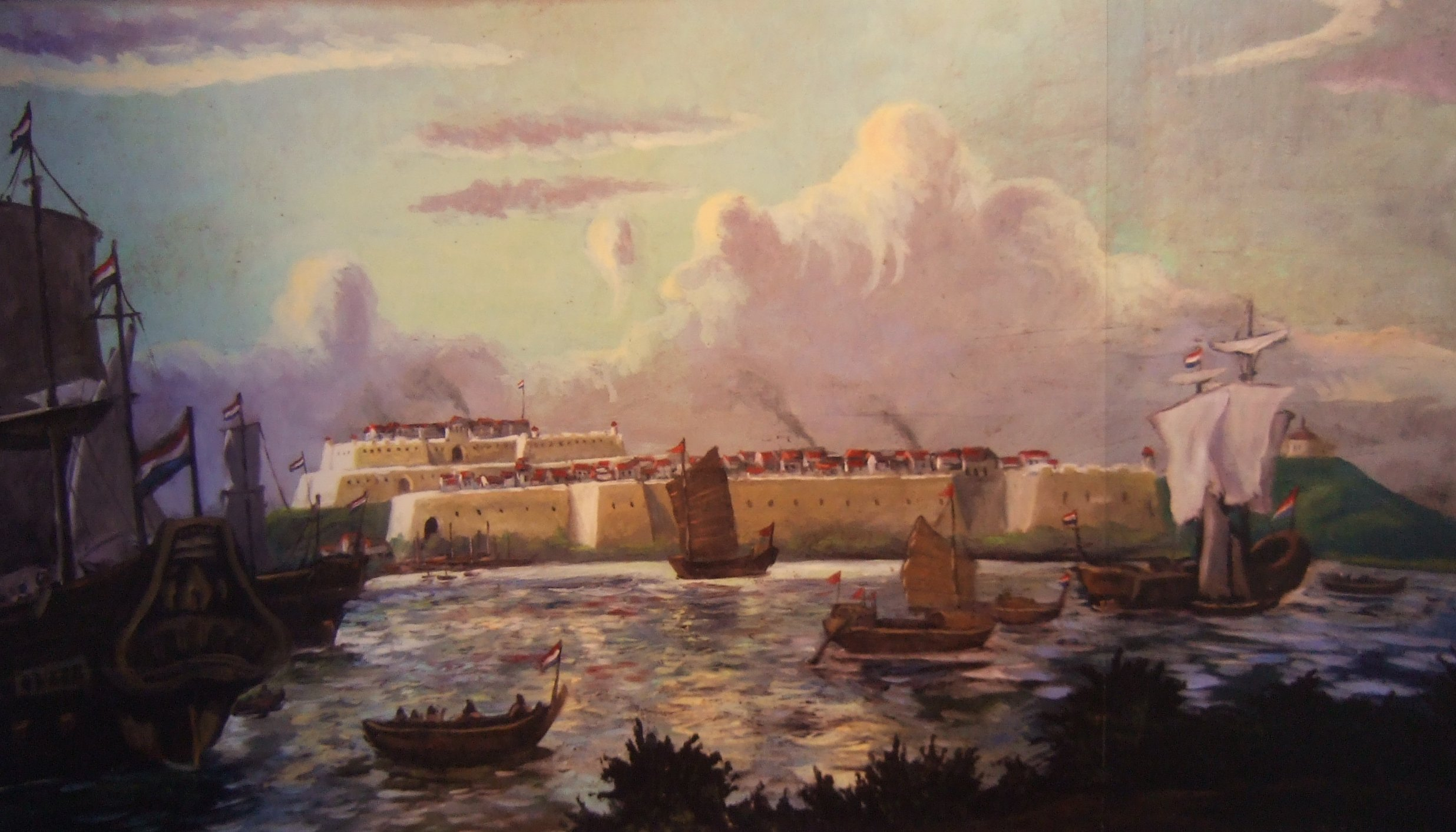
Painting showing the environment of inner Fort Zeelandia

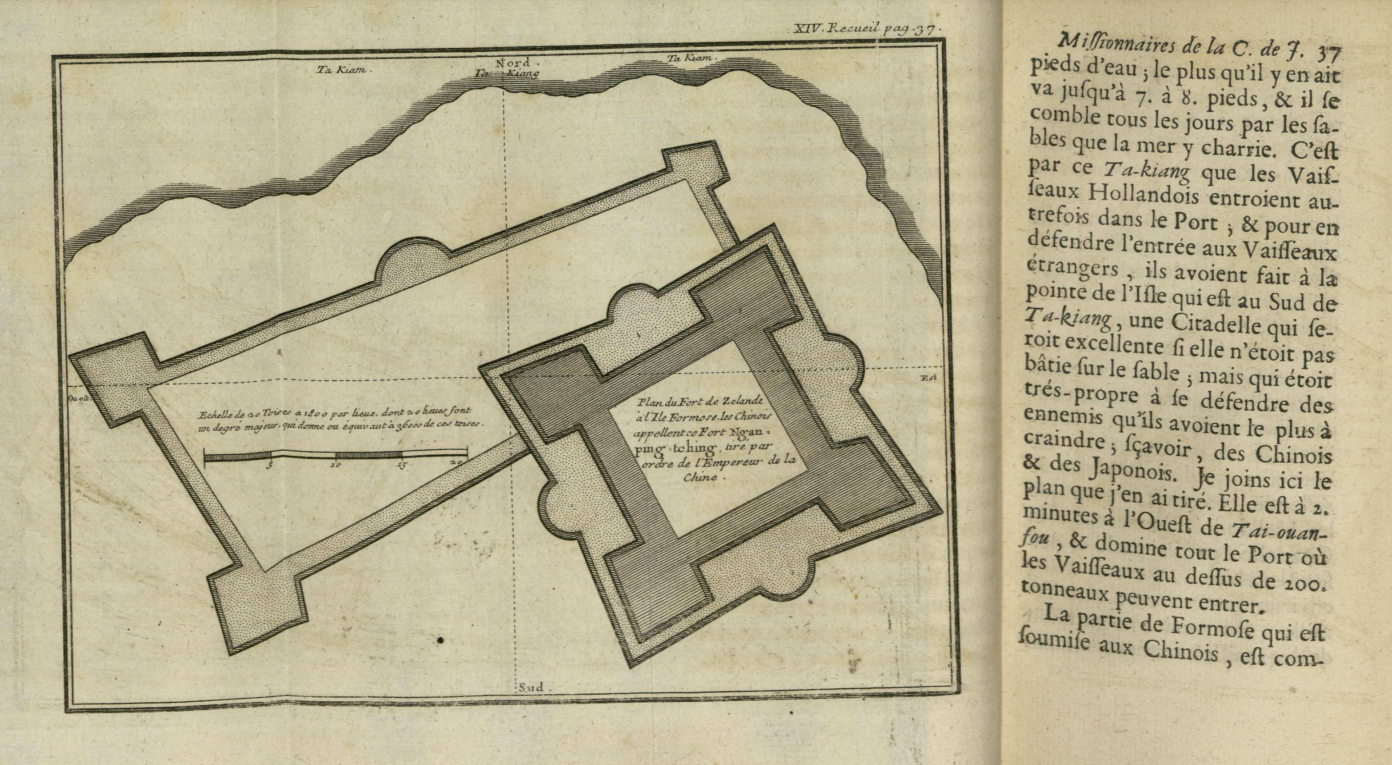
Plan of Fort Zeelandia in a 1707 letter

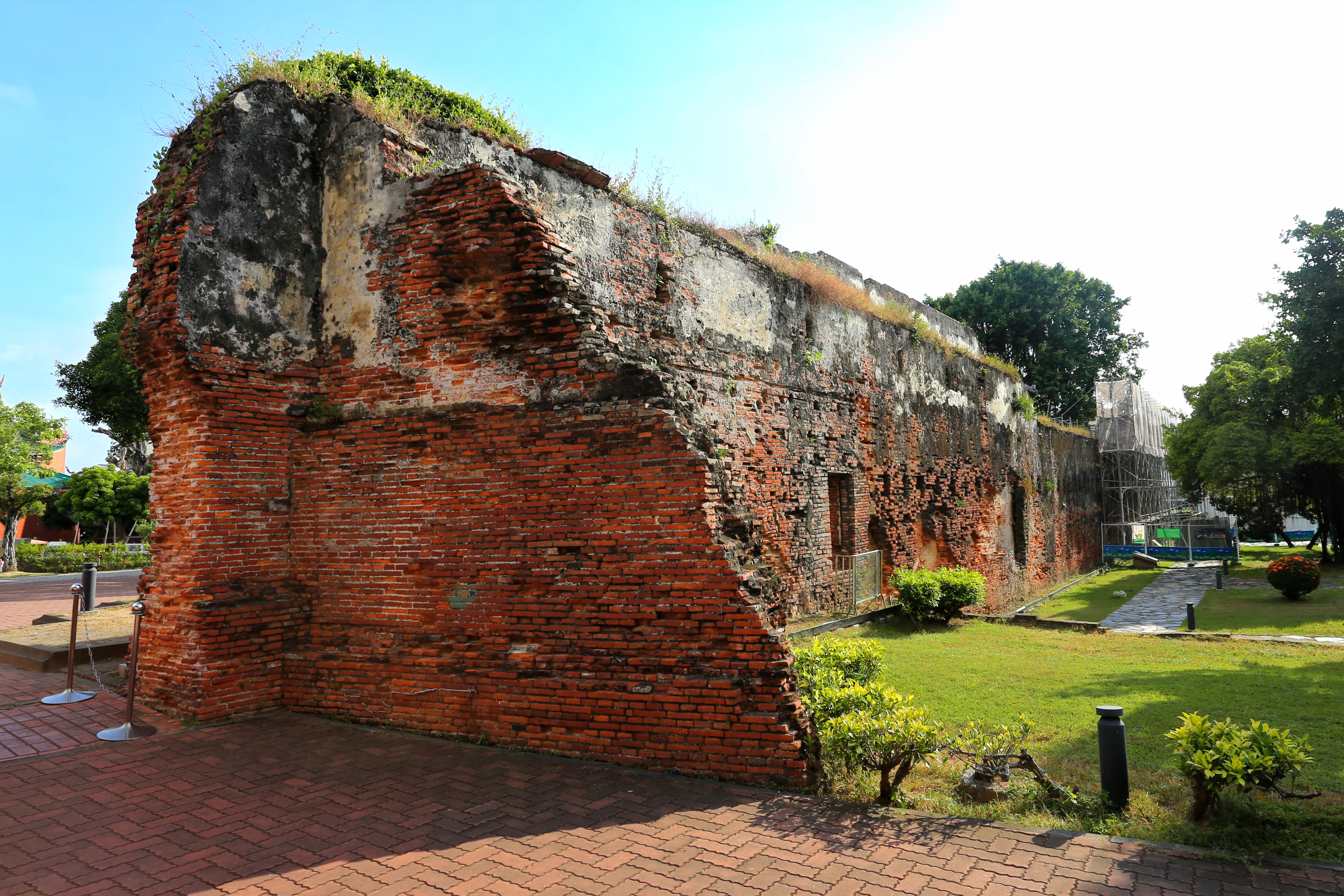
Remnants of the southern wall

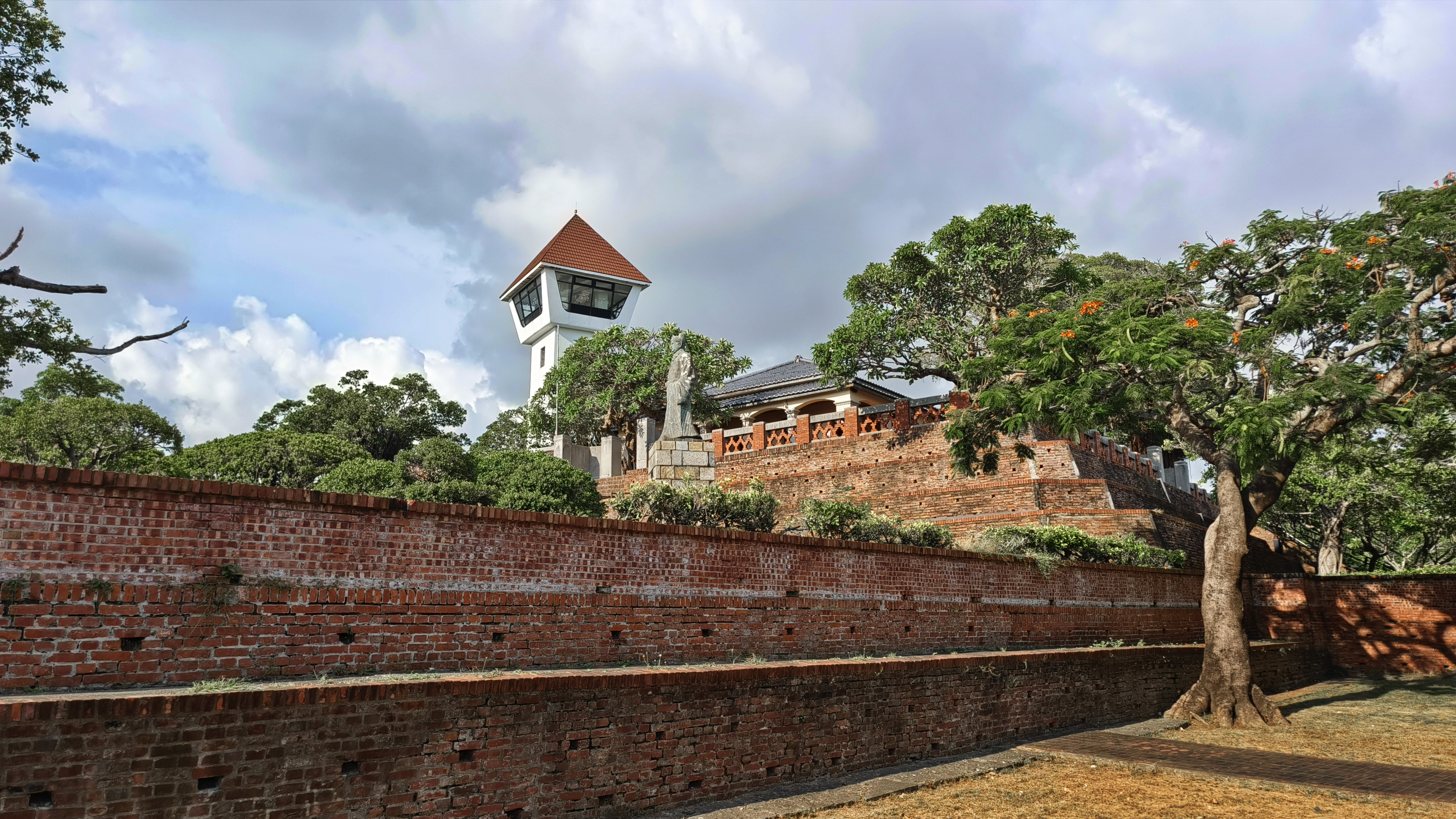
Outer wall

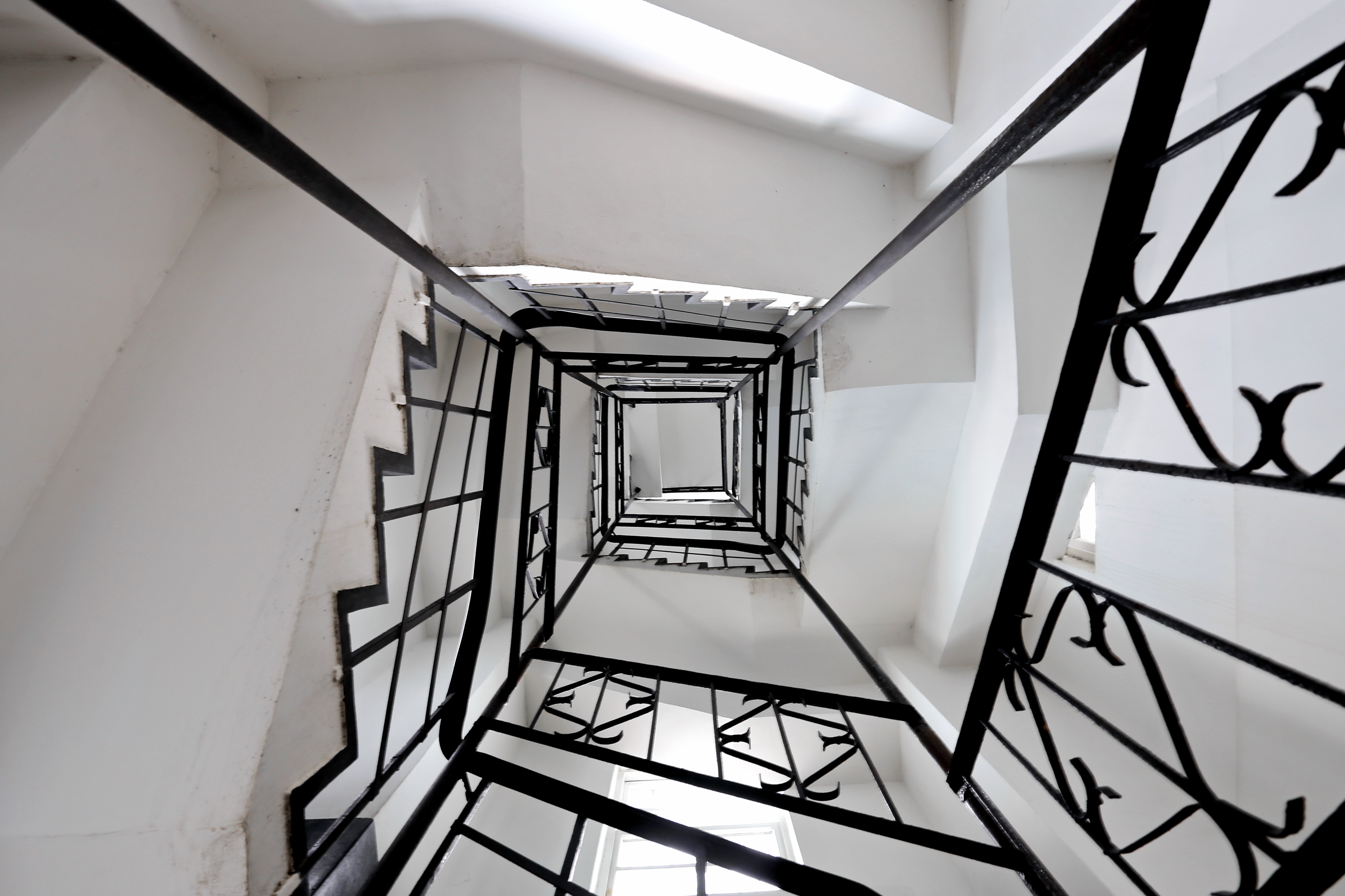
Watch tower stairwell

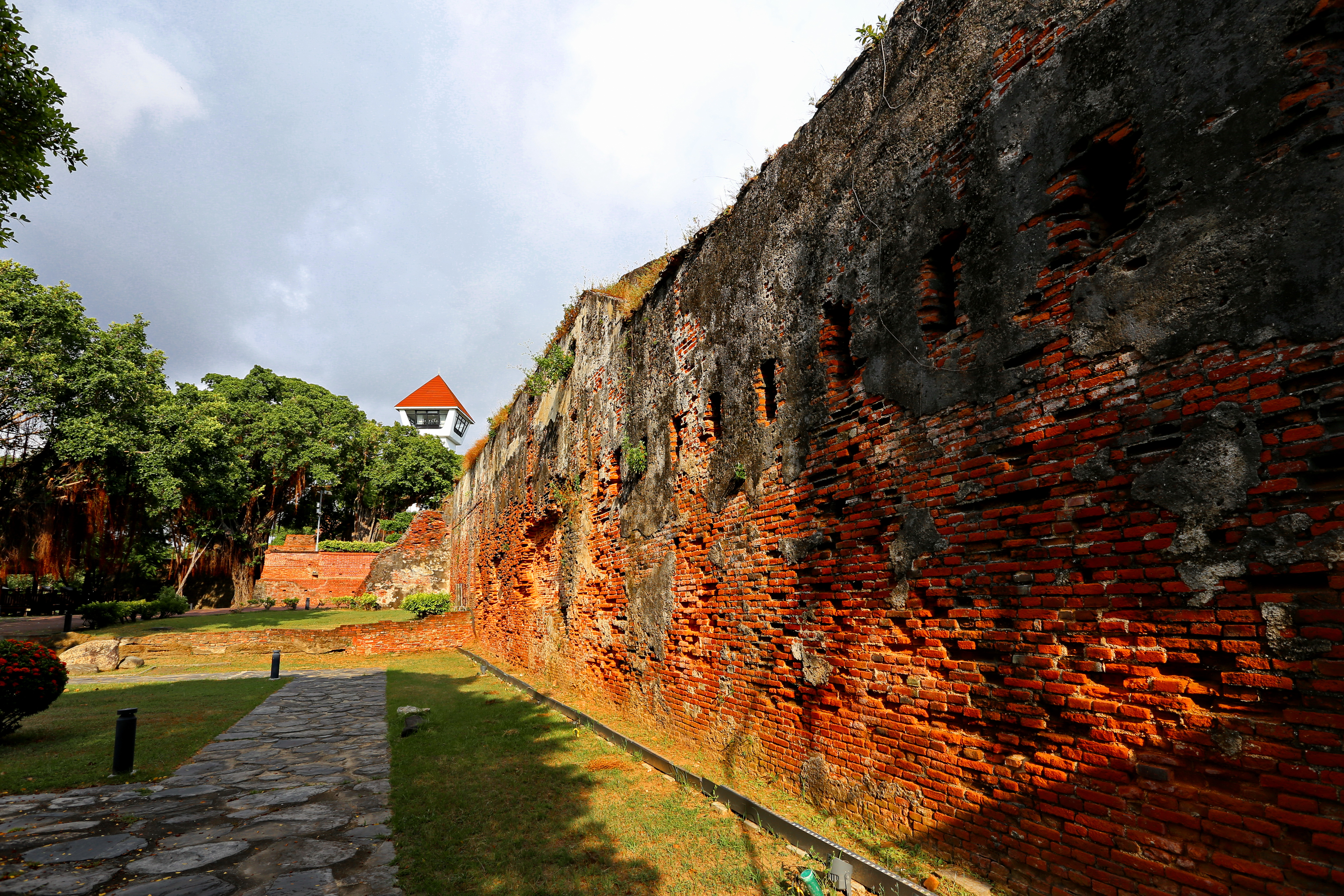
Remnants of the southern wall

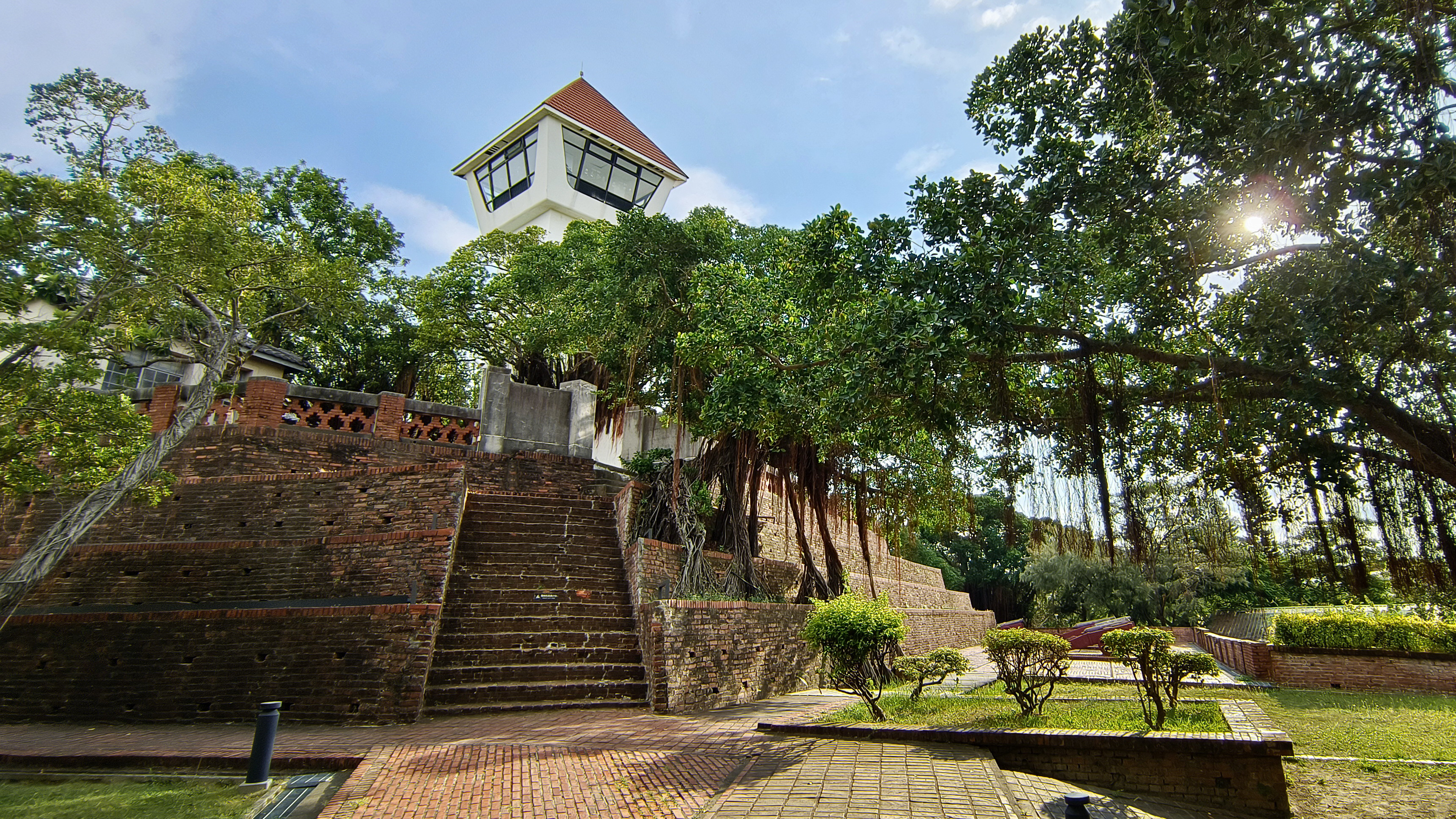
Watch tower

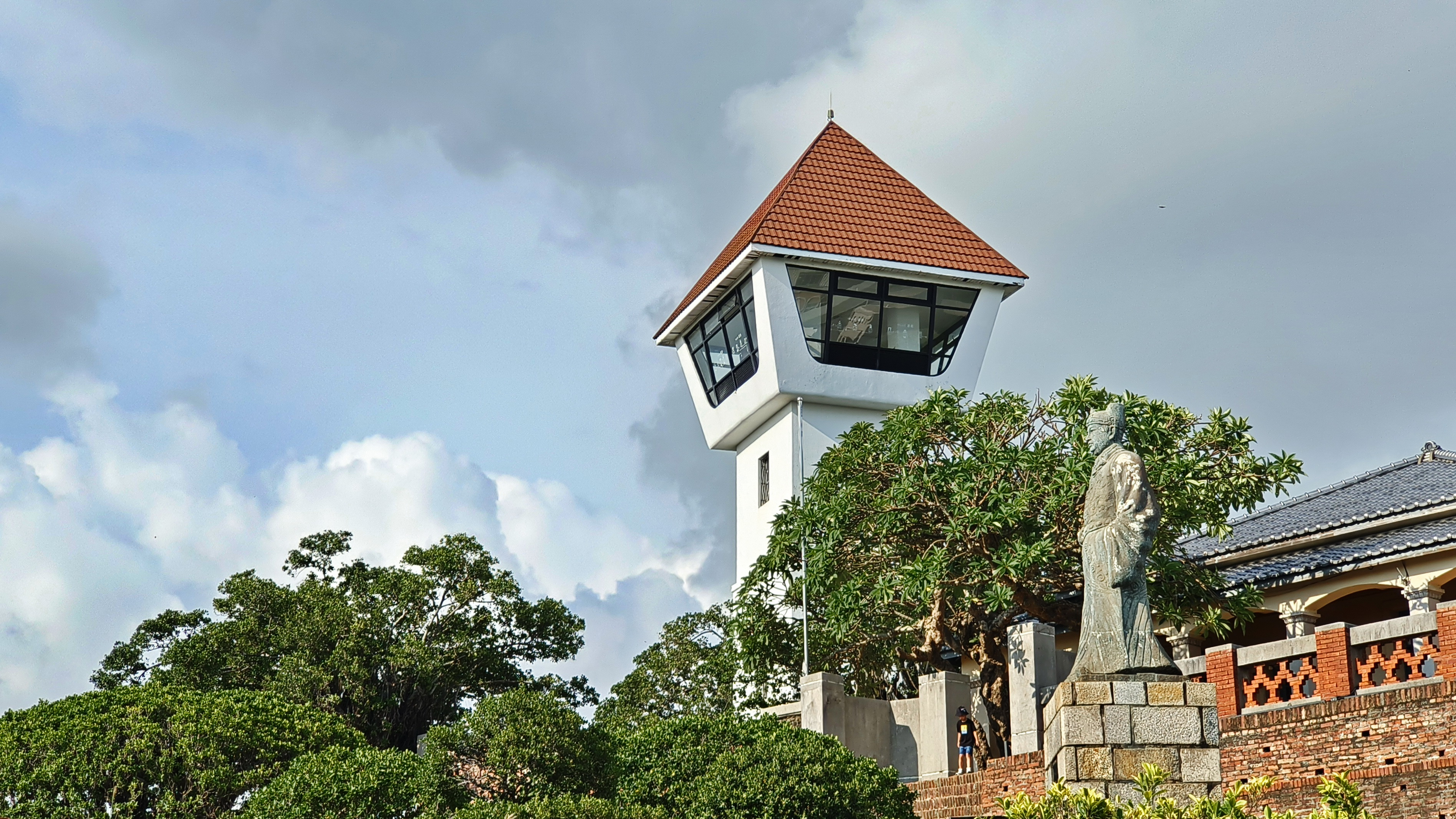
Watch tower and statue of Koxinga

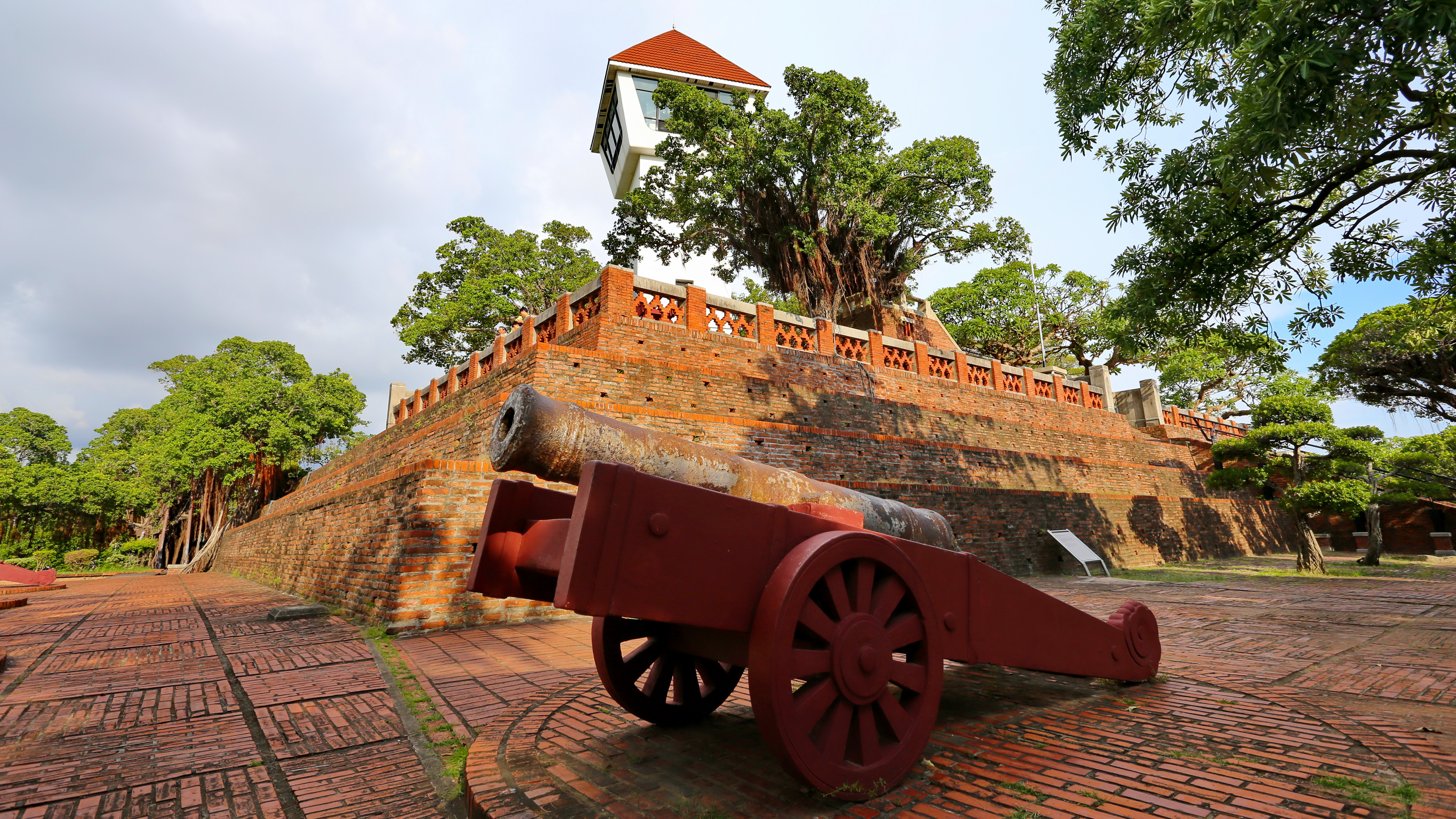
Cannon

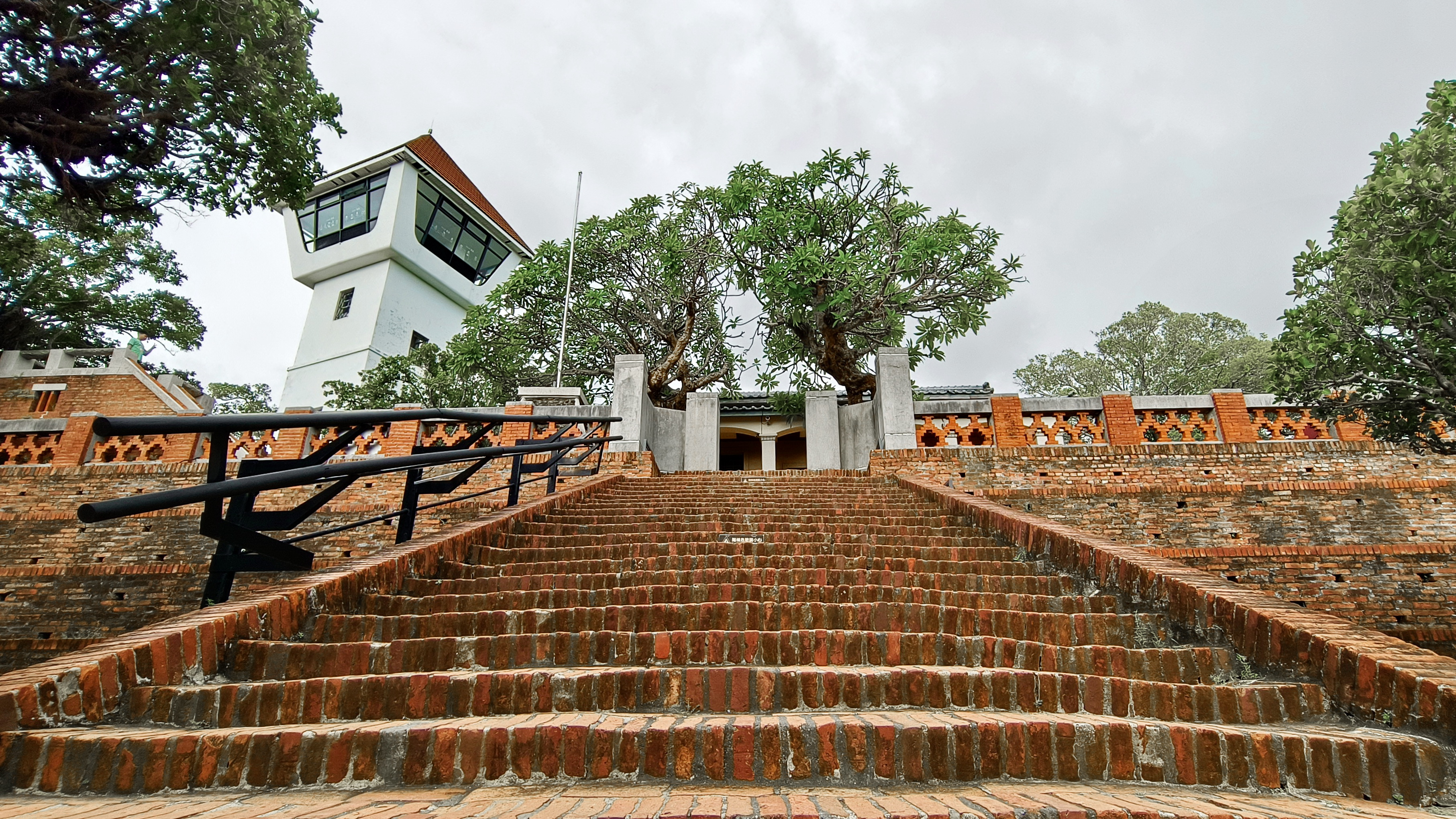
Steps leading to the top of the fort

== See also ==
- Fort Provintia
- List of museums in Taiwan

== Bibliography ==
- Coyett, Frederick (1903) [First published 1675 in 't verwaerloosde Formosa]. "Arrival and Victory of Koxinga". In Campbell, William (ed.). Formosa under the Dutch: described from contemporary records, with explanatory notes and a bibliography of the island. London: Kegan Paul. pp. 412–459. ISBN 9789576380839. OCLC 644323041.
- Davidson, James W. (1903). The Island of Formosa, Past and Present : history, people, resources, and commercial prospects : tea, camphor, sugar, gold, coal, sulphur, economical plants, and other productions. London and New York: Macmillan. OL 6931635M.
- Valentijn, François (1903) [First published 1724 in Oud en Nieuw Oost-Indiën]. "History of the Dutch Trade". In Campbell, William (ed.). Formosa under the Dutch: described from contemporary records, with explanatory notes and a bibliography of the island. London: Kegan Paul. pp. 25–75. ISBN 9789576380839. OCLC 644323041.
