= Santisima Trinidad (Taiwan) =

Former bay in Keelung, Taiwan

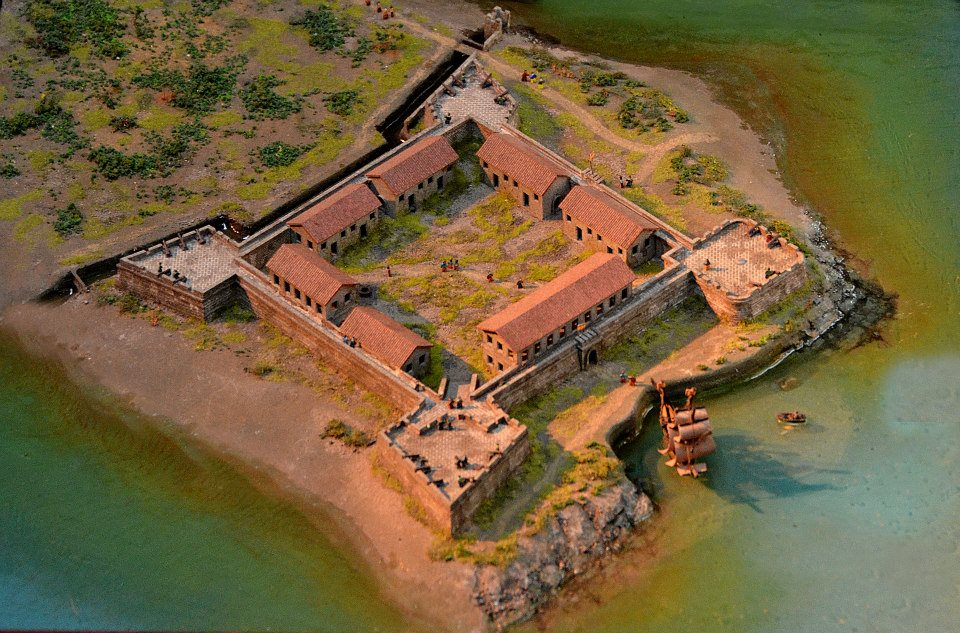
A model of Fort San Salvador

Santísima Trinidad (meaning "Holy Trinity") was a bay on the northeast coast of Taiwan at Keelung, where in 1626 the Spanish established a settlement and built Fort San Salvador. They occupied the site until 1642 when they were driven out by the Dutch. The Dutch remodelled the Spanish fort, reduced its size and renamed it Fort Noort-Holland.

In 1661, Koxinga, a Southern Ming loyalist, with 400 warships and 25,000 men laid siege to the main Dutch fortress (Zeelandia in Anping). The Dutch garrison of 2000 soldiers withdrew from Fort Noort-Holland when it became clear that no reinforcements were forthcoming from Zeelandia or Batavia (present day Jakarta, Indonesia).

In 1663, the Dutch returned to Keelung, retook the fort, strengthened and enlarged it and kept it until 1668, when they voluntarily abandoned it, as the trade in Keelung was not what they expected it to be.

== See also ==
- Port of Keelung
- Fort Provintia
- Cape of San Diego
- Eternal Golden Castle
- History of Taiwan
- Dutch Formosa
- Spanish Formosa
- Military history of Taiwan

== Bibliography ==
- Andrade, Tonio (2005). "Chapter 4: La Isla Hermosa, The Rise of the Spanish Colony in Northern Taiwan". How Taiwan Became Chinese: Dutch, Spanish, and Han Colonization in the Seventeenth Century. Columbia University Press.
- Davidson, James W. (1903). The Island of Formosa, Past and Present : history, people, resources, and commercial prospects : tea, camphor, sugar, gold, coal, sulphur, economical plants, and other productions. London and New York: Macmillan. OCLC 1887893. OL 6931635M.
