= Daan District, Taichung =

District in Taichung, Taiwan

Coordinates: 24.365237°N 120.590202°E

Daan 大安區 Da'an, Daian
- District
- Daan District
- Country: Taiwan
- Municipality: Taichung

Area
  - Total: 27.4045 km^{2} (10.5809 sq mi)

Population (March 2023)
  - Total: 18,177
  - Density: 663.29/km^{2} (1,717.9/sq mi)
- Time zone: UTC+8 (CST)
- Website: www.daan.taichung.gov.tw (in Chinese)

Daan District (Chinese: 大安區; pinyin: Dà'ān Qū) is a coastal suburban district in Taichung, Taiwan, upgraded from Da-an Township. It lies between the Dajia river and the Da-an river.

The district's economy is based on rice.

The climate is sub-tropical.

== History ==
In March 1842, during the First Opium War, the brig Ann became shipwrecked near Daan harbour. It had 57 personnel, mostly Indian seacunnies and lascars. Survivors of the wreck, along with the survivors of the Nerbudda shipwreck in September 1841, were executed in Tainan in August 1842.

== Administrative divisions ==
Nanpu, Nanzhuang, Zhongzhuang, Tong'an, Fuxing, Guike, Ding'an, Yong'an, Fuzhu, Haiqi, Xi'an and Songya Villages.

== Tourist attractions ==
- Da'an Coastal Park
