= Spanish expedition to Formosa =

1626 military expedition to Taiwan

Formosa Expedition
- Flag of New Spain.
Date	1626
Location	Keelung, Taiwan 25°8′N 121°44′E
Result	Spanish victory: Spanish establishment in Formosa

Belligerents
Kingdom of Middag	(Spain) Spanish East Indies

Strength
	200 Spaniards and 400 native Filipinos
- Location within Taiwan

The Spanish expedition to Formosa was a campaign mounted by the Spanish based in Manila, Philippines in 1626. It was the Spanish response to Dutch settlements being built in Formosa, now known as Taiwan. In cooperation with the Portuguese, this venture was made to attract Chinese traders and curtail the expansion of Dutch power in Asia.

== Background ==
As part of its campaign in Asia, the Dutch East India Company attempted to establish a trading outpost on the Penghu Islands (Pescadores) in 1622, but were driven off by the Ming authorities. In 1624, the Company established a stronghold called Fort Zeelandia on the coastal islet of Tayouan, which is now part of the main island at Anping, Tainan. David Wright, a Scottish agent of the Company who lived on the island in the 1650s, described the lowland areas of the island as being divided among 11 chiefdoms ranging in size from two settlements to 72. Some of these fell under Dutch control while others remained independent. The Company began to import laborers from Fujian and Penghu (Pescadores), many of whom settled.

== Expedition ==
On 5 May 1626, the first Spanish landing on Formosa, as ordered by Governor-General of the Philippines Fernándo de Silva, was at Cape Santiago, but they decided that the area was not suitable for defense. So, the Spanish continued westwards along the coast until they arrived at Keelung. A deep and well-protected harbor, including a small island in the mouth of the harbor, made it the ideal spot to build the first settlement, which they named Santisima Trinidad. Forts were built, both on the island and on the harbor itself. It was garrisoned by hundreds of Spaniards (Spanish Filipino) and native Filipino soldiers from the Philippines. The colony was designed to protect Spanish and Portuguese trade from interference by the Dutch base in the south of Taiwan.

== Aftermath ==
Fort Santo Domingo was built by the Spanish in 1629 at Tamsui after which the present site of the Fort was named in order to bolster the success of establishing Spanish power in Formosa. On a night in 1636, a group of local people, angered by the taxes that the Spanish governor had imposed, successfully attacked the fort and demolished it. In 1637, the Spanish rebuilt the fort using stone and raised the height of the walls to twenty feet or more.

However, in August 1642, the Dutch returned to Keelung with four large ships, several smaller ships, and with approximately 369 Dutch soldiers. A combination of Spaniards, aboriginals, and Pampangos from the Philippines held off troops for six days, they eventually returned to Manila defeated, and gave up their flags and what little artillery remained with them. Sebastián Hurtado de Corcuera, governor of the Philippines, was originally to blame for the loss of the Formosa and was eventually tried in court for his actions, and was imprisoned for five years in the Philippines. Historians since Corcuera's time have chastised him for the loss of the Formosa, but other factors, such as the continuing rise of the Dutch Empire in Southeast Asia, and financial troubles within the Spanish Empire, were also contributing factors.

== See also ==
- Spanish Formosa
- Spanish Filipino
- Dutch Formosa
- Spanish East Indies
- Category:History of the Philippines (1565–1898), Spanish colonial period in the Philippines

== Bibliography ==
- Boxer, C.R. (1965). The Dutch Seaborne Empire 1600–1800. Hutchinson.
- Davidson, James W. (1903). The Island of Formosa, Past and Present : history, people, resources, and commercial prospects: tea, camphor, sugar, gold, coal, sulphur, economical plants, and other productions. London and New York: Macmillan. OCLC 1887893. OL 6931635M.
