= Nerbudda incident =

Execution during the First Opium War

- Part of the First Opium War
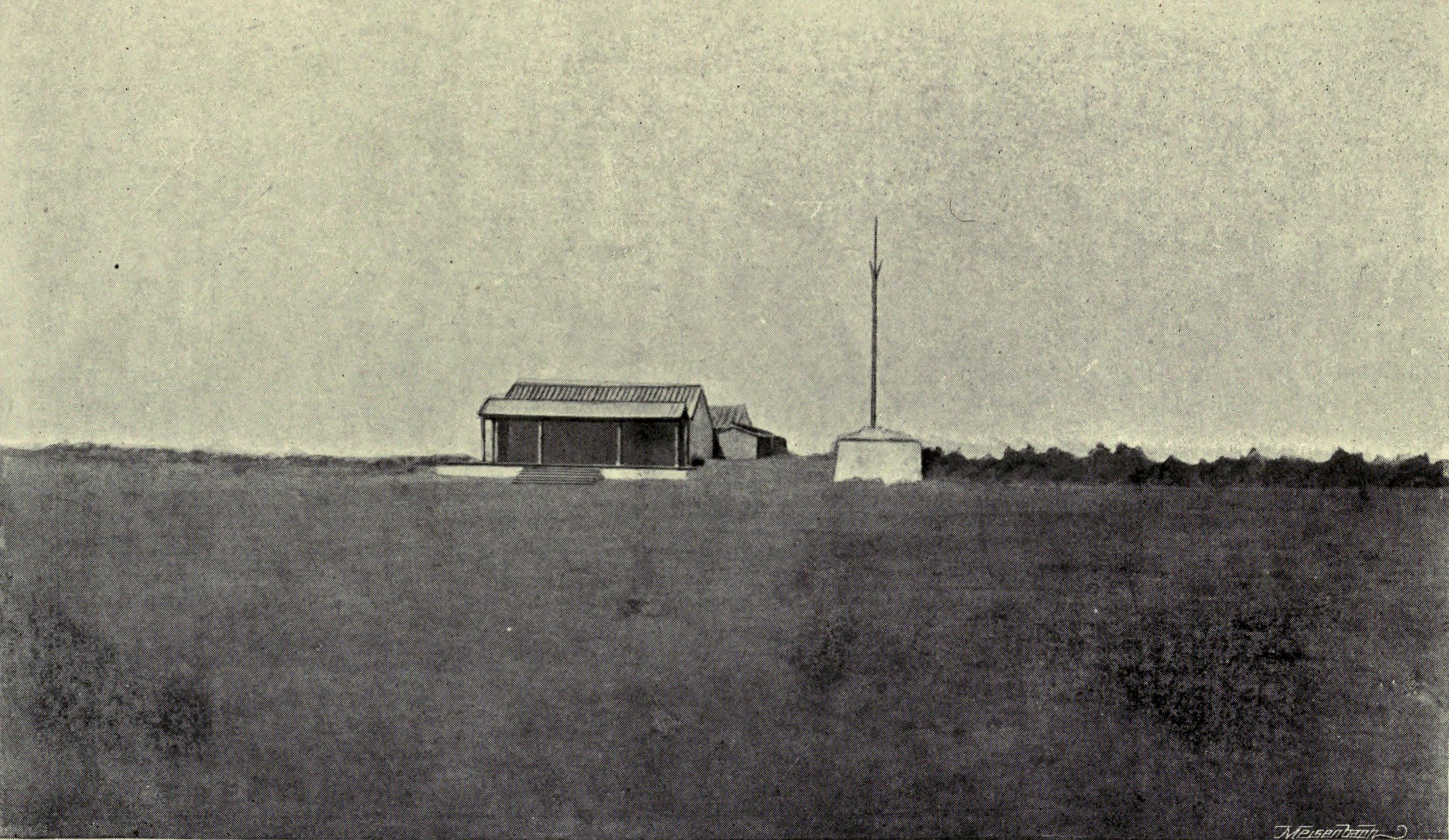
- The parade ground in Taiwan where the victims of the incident were publicly executed
- Location: 25.1511°N 121.7561°E; Taiwan, Taiwan Prefecture, Qing Empire (now Tainan, Taiwan)
- Date: 10 August 1842
- Target: Survivors of Nerbudda and Ann
- Attack type: Mass beheading
- Deaths: 197 prisoners executed 87 dead from ill-treatment
- Perpetrator: (Qing dynasty) Qing China

The Nerbudda incident (Chinese: 吶爾不噠號事件) was the summary execution of 197 crewmembers of the British merchant ships Nerbudda and Ann on 10 August 1842 by Chinese authorities in Taiwan during the First Opium War. An additional 87 prisoners died from mistreatment in Chinese captivity.

In September 1841, Nerbudda was shipwrecked off northern Taiwan near Keelung, and in March 1842 Ann was shipwrecked at Da'an harbour. Surviving crewmembers from both ships—primarily Indian camp followers and lascars—were captured by Chinese forces and marched south to the prefectural capital of Taiwan, where they were imprisoned in a granary before being beheaded in August. The Daoguang Emperor ordered their execution on 14 May 1842 after Britain's victory over the Chinese at the Battle of Ningpo. Out of the nearly 300 survivors of both ships who landed or attempted to land in Taiwan, only 11 survived the war.

== Background ==
During the 18th and 19th centuries, the British East India Company (EIC) viewed Taiwan as a viable location for a trading post, as the island had abundant amounts of natural resources. EIC officials unsuccessfully lobbied the British government to establish control over Taiwan and grant them a trade monopoly there. In 1840, a British national named William Huttmann wrote a letter to Foreign Secretary Lord Palmerston claiming that given the strategic and commercial value of the island and the Qing dynasty's weak control over it, a single warship and fewer than 1,500 troops could successfully occupy eastern Taiwan, allowing Britain to develop trade routes with the outside world. During the First Opium War, the Royal Navy patrolled the Taiwan Strait and the Penghu, though making no attempt to attack Taiwan itself.

== Shipwrecks ==
=== Nerbudda ===
In early September 1841, the British merchant ship Nerbudda set sail from Hong Kong Island to Chusan. It had 274 crewmembers, consisting of 243 Indians, 29 Europeans and two Filipinos from Manila. A severe gale dismasted the ship, which drifted towards the northern coast of Taiwan and struck a reef. All 29 Europeans, accompanied by three Indians and the two Filipinos, left Nerbudda in a row boat, leaving behind 240 Indians, 170 of whom were camp followers and 70 lascars. The ship, which was supplied with provisions, lay in smooth water in Keelung bay for five days, during which the remaining crew and passengers prepared rafts. In attempting to land, some drowned in the surf, others were killed by local scavengers on the shore and the rest were captured by Chinese authorities, who separated them into small parties and marched them to the prefectural capital of Taiwan. Only around 150 Indians are thought to have made it on shore. Meanwhile, those in the row boat proceeded along the eastern coast of Taiwan. After being adrift for several days, they were discovered by the British merchant schooner Black Swan and taken back to Hong Kong.

Two senior Chinese officials in Taiwan, the general Dahonga (達洪阿) and the intendant Yao Ying (姚瑩), subsequently filed an inaccurate report to the Daoguang Emperor, claiming to have sunk Nerbudda from the Keelung fort while defending it against a naval attack on 30 September, killing 32 enemies and capturing 133. (Note: They reported that 5 "white", 5 "red" and 22 "black" foreigners were killed and 133 "black" foreigners were captured.) In response, the emperor sent rewards to both officials. However, the battle never occurred and the people they claimed to have killed or captured were the shipwrecked survivors of Nerbudda. Only two ended up surviving Chinese captivity (the head and second serang) both of whom were sent to Amoy after the executions the following year.

=== Ann ===
In March 1842, the British brig Ann set sail from Chusan to Macao. It had 57 crewmembers consisting of 34 Indians, 14 Europeans and Americans, five Chinese and four Portuguese or Malaysians. Most were lascars. Strong winds drifted the ship on shore and the ebb tide caused it to run aground near Da'an harbour. The crew of Ann commandeered a Chinese junk in an attempt to set out to sea, but a gale disrupted the plan, and it was soon captured by the Chinese. Dahonga and Yao Ying again sent a disingenuous report, claiming that Chinese fishing vessels had destroyed Ann in self-defence. Only nine survivors were spared in the executions in August 1842. In 1843, a list of the names of the 57 crewmen and their fate was published in The Chinese Repository, revealing that 43 were beheaded, two died in prison, two died in the wreck of Ann, one escaped, eight were set free and sent to Amoy and one, a Chinese man, was retained as an interpreter. Of the eight prisoners set free, six were European or American, one was Indian and the other Chinese.

== Rescue attempts ==
From 19 to 27 October 1841, the Royal Navy sloop HMS Nimrod sailed to Keelung and offered 100 dollars for the return of each survivor of Nerbudda. However, after finding out they were sent south for imprisonment, the commander of Nimrod, Captain Joseph Pearse, ordered the bombardment of the harbour, destroying 27 cannon before returning to Hong Kong. On 8 October 1842, Commander William Nevill of HMS Serpent left Amoy for Taiwan. Captain Henry Ducie Chads of HMS Cambrian had ordered him to inquire about the survivors of both ships "under a Flag of Truce". By that time, the British were aware that the captives had already been executed by the Chinese. Nevill brought a letter from Chads addressed to the governor of Taiwan, requesting the release of any remaining survivors, but reported that his reception was uncourteous and Chads' letter was not accepted by Chinese officials. The British were told that the remaining survivors of the two ships were being sent to Foochow. On 12 October, they returned to Amoy.

When HMS Serpent arrived in Anping, she found 25 survivors from the 26-strong crew of the British merchant ship Herculaneum, which left Singapore on 6 September 1842 under Captain Stroyan carrying coal from Calcutta for British steamers in Chusan; she had been thought lost. Unlike the survivors of Nerbudda and Ann, Stroyan and his crew were well-treated, though because they knew the fate of many other wreck victims, all lived in constant fear of their lives. It is possible, depending on the credibility of contemporary newspaper reports, that Chinese authorities in Taiwan largely spared European survivors, instead focusing their executions on Indian prisoners. The contemporary reports of the rescue of the Herculaneum crew claimed that of the 197 total survivors of Nerbudda and Ann, 30 died, 157 were executed including eight Britons, one of whom was Robert Gully, the son of prize fighter and MP John Gully, and 10 were freed and sent to Amoy. HMS Serpent arrived in Amoy with the surviving crew of Herculaneum on 12 October, the survivors of Nerbudda and Ann not arriving until 25 October, almost two weeks later.

== Execution ==
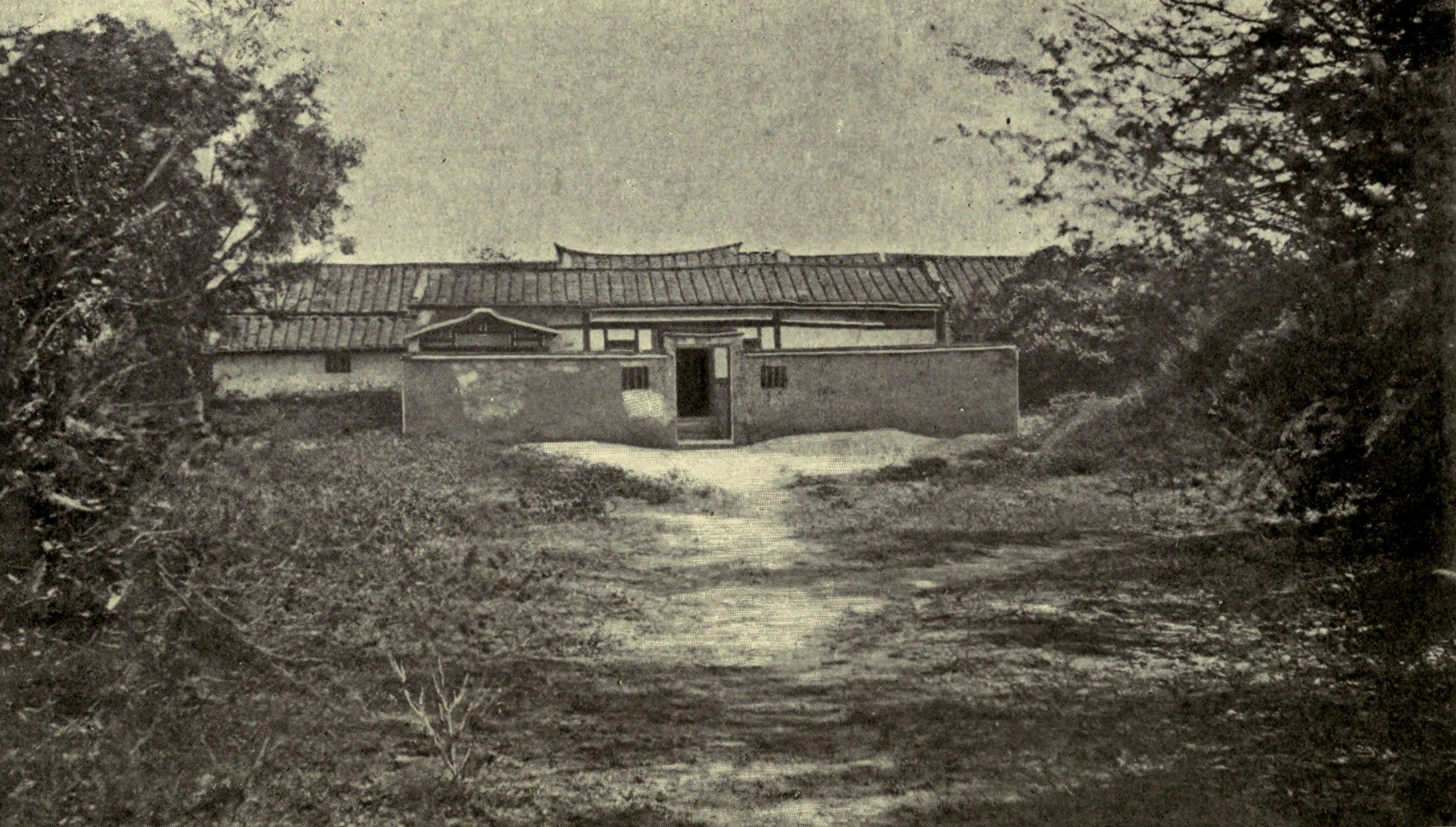
The granary in Taiwan where the prisoners were held captive

After the crew of Nerbudda were captured, Dahonga and Yao Ying solicited permission from their superiors in Peking to execute them as invaders. On 14 May 1842, the Daoguang Emperor released an edict after British forces repulsed China's attempt to recapture Ningbo in Zhejiang province. With regards to the prisoners from Ann, he ordered: "after acquiring their confessions, only the leaders of the rebellious barbarians should be imprisoned. The remaining rebellious barbarians and the 130-odd (Note: In Chinese documents, 139 captives (3 red, 10 white, and 126 black foreigners) were executed in Tainan as reported in Yao Ying's memorial to the emperor.) that were captured last year shall all be immediately executed in order to release our anger and enliven our hearts." On 10 August, (Note: A Taiwanese scholar, after researching British and Chinese documents, concluded that the executions were conducted from 9 to 13 August 1842.) the captives were taken two or three miles outside the city walls to a parade ground. Their execution was reported in The Chinese Repository:

All the rest—one hundred and ninety-seven [prisoners]—were placed at small distances from each other on their knees, their feet in irons and hands manacled behind their backs, thus waiting for the executioners, who went round, and with a kind of two-handed sword cut off their heads without being laid on a block. Afterwards their bodies were all thrown into one grave, and their heads stuck up in cages on the seashore.

87 other prisoners died from ill-treatment while in captivity. Merchant Robert Gully and Captain Frank Denham wrote a journal while they were imprisoned. Gully was executed while Denham survived. On 25 October, one of the freed survivors, Mr. Newman, received a "leaf" of Gully's log from a Chinese soldier who said it was obtained from Gully's shirt, which was stripped off him at the hour of execution. It contained his last known diary entry, dated 10 August. The journals of Gully and Denham were published in London in 1844. In 1876, a memoir by Dan Patridge, a survivor of the Ann, was also published in London.

== Aftermath ==
On 23 November 1842, Plenipotentiary Henry Pottinger condemned China's massacre of non-combatants and demanded that the officials responsible for them be degraded, punished and their property confiscated with the amount paid to the British government for compensation to the families of those executed. He stated that he obtained proof the emperor ordered the execution, but that it was due to the Chinese authorities in Taiwan falsely reporting that they were a hostile group who attacked the island despite the vessels not being warships and the captured crew not being military personnel. The potential repercussions concerned the Qing government, who had just concluded peace negotiations with Britain in the Treaty of Nanking a few months earlier. On 11 January 1843, the emperor ordered a judicial inquiry into Dahonga and Yao Ying.

The governor of Fujian and Zhejiang, Yiliang (怡良), was dispatched as commissioner to Taiwan. After an investigation, he reported that both commanders confessed to sending fabricated reports of defending against a naval attack. In April 1843, they were recalled to Peking. After being interrogated, they were imprisoned but released by the emperor on 18 October, having served only 12 days in prison. Later that year, Yao Ying claimed that his actions were done to boost the declining morale of Qing officials and troops. On 16 December, Dahonga was assigned to a post at Hami in Xinjiang province, while Yao Ying received an appointment in Sichuan province. The British government were not aware of the postings until the governor of Hong Kong, John Francis Davis, informed Foreign Secretary Lord Aberdeen on 11 March 1845.

In 1867, 25 years after the executions, an interview was published in which British physician William Maxwell asked an old clerk in a Taiwan hong if he remembered the beheadings. He responded in the affirmative and claimed that on the same day, a heavy thunderstorm formed and lasted for three days, drowning an estimated 1,000 to 2,000 people: "I remember that day well, and a black day it was for Formosa... that was a judgment from Heaven for beheading the Foreigners; but it was done in revenge for your soldiers taking Amoy".

== Notes ==
Footnotes

Citations
