= Cape Santiago (Taiwan) =

Cape in Gongliao, New Taipei, Taiwan

Cape Santiago Sāndiāojiǎo
- Cape
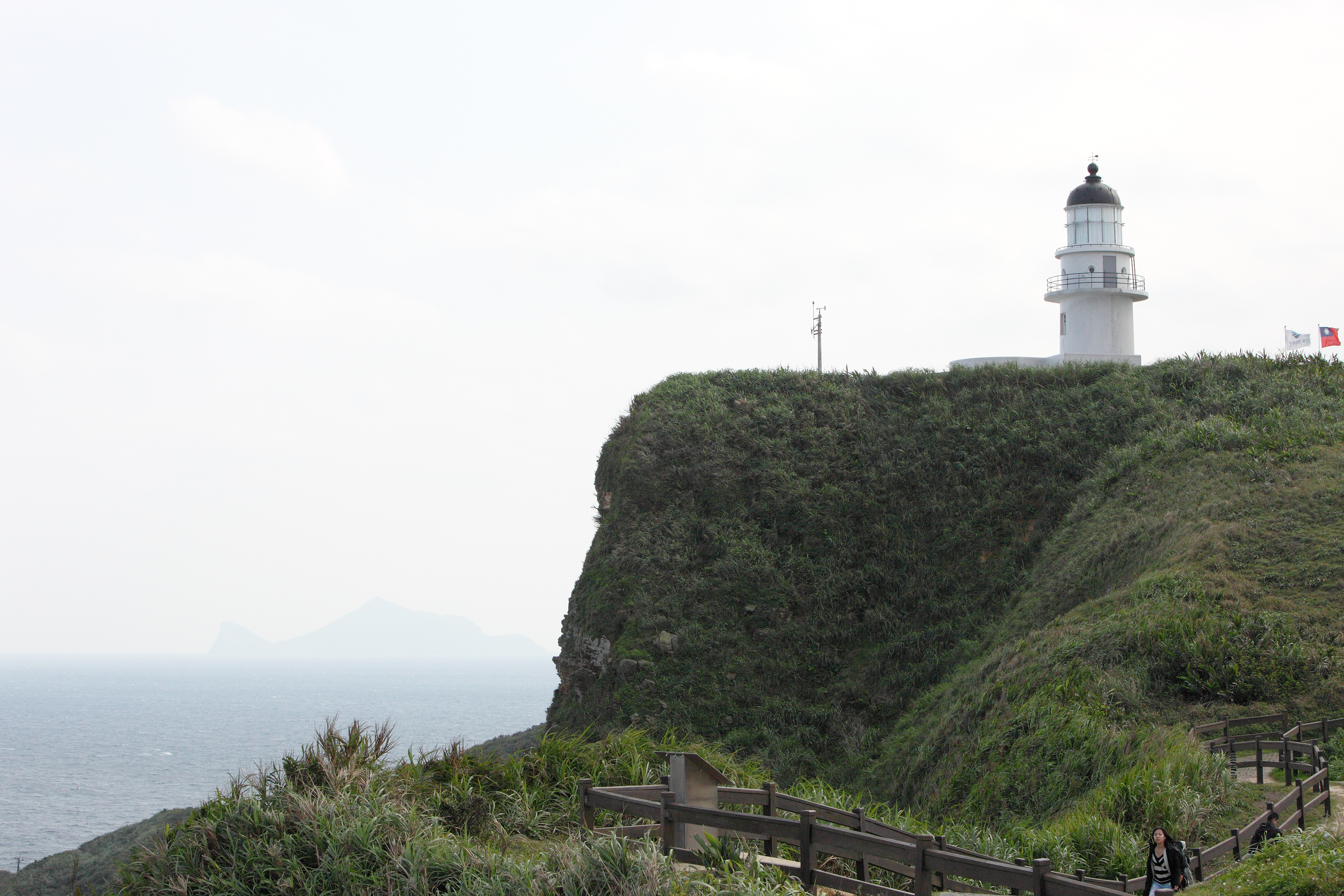
- Lighthouse at Cape Santiago

- Location within Taiwan
- Coordinates: 25°00′27″N 122°00′06″E
- Location: Gongliao District, New Taipei City, Taiwan

Cape Santiago
- Chinese: 三貂角
Transcriptions
Standard Mandarin
- Hanyu Pinyin: Sāndiāojiǎo
Southern Min
- Hokkien POJ: Sam-tiau-kak

Cape Santiago (Note: "San Diego" is found in the tourism literature but is incorrect) is a cape on the easternmost point of the island of Taiwan, located in Gongliao District, New Taipei City.

== History ==
On 5 May 1626, a Spanish fleet reached the northeast tip of Taiwan and named the native village of Caquiunauan (also Caguiuanuan; present-day Fulong Village) as Santiago. Later this name was extended to the nearby cape.

== Tourist attractions ==
There is a lighthouse situated on Cape Santiago, called Cape Santiago Lighthouse. A nearby beach, Yenliao (鹽寮), was the site of the first landing for the Japanese invasion of Taiwan in 1895.

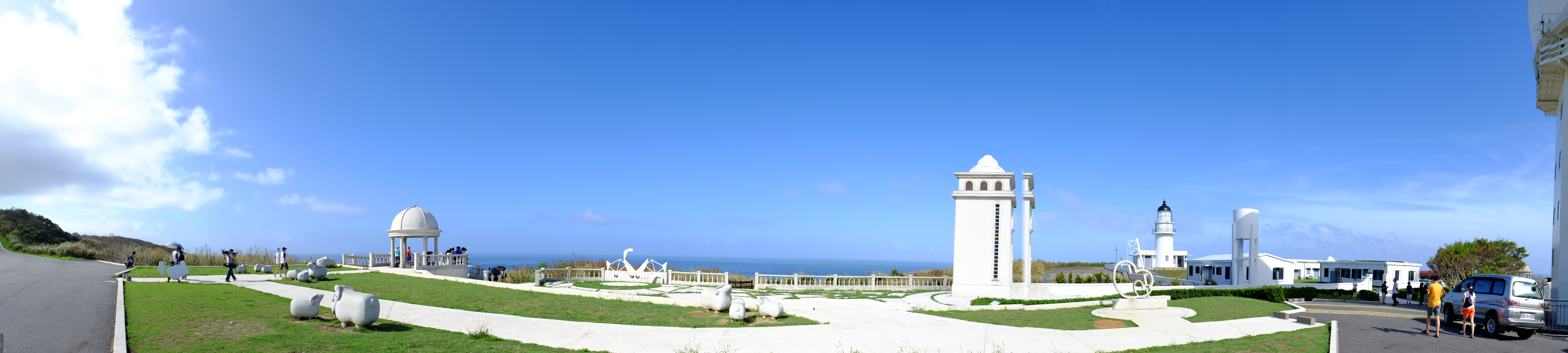
The square at Cape Santiago Lighthouse

== See also ==
- List of tourist attractions in Taiwan
- Fort Santo Domingo
- Fort Zeelandia (Taiwan)
- Fort Provintia
- List of Taiwanese superlatives

== Bibliography ==
- Andrade, Tonio (2008). "Chapter 4: La Isla Hermosa". How Taiwan Became Chinese : Dutch, Spanish and Han Colonization in the Seventeenth Century. New York: Columbia University Press. ISBN 9780231128551.
- Davidson, James W. (1903). The Island of Formosa, Past and Present : history, people, resources, and commercial prospects : tea, camphor, sugar, gold, coal, sulphur, economical plants, and other productions. London and New York: Macmillan. OL 6931635M.
