= Haishan Hall =

Hall in Anping, Tainan, Taiwan

- 海山館
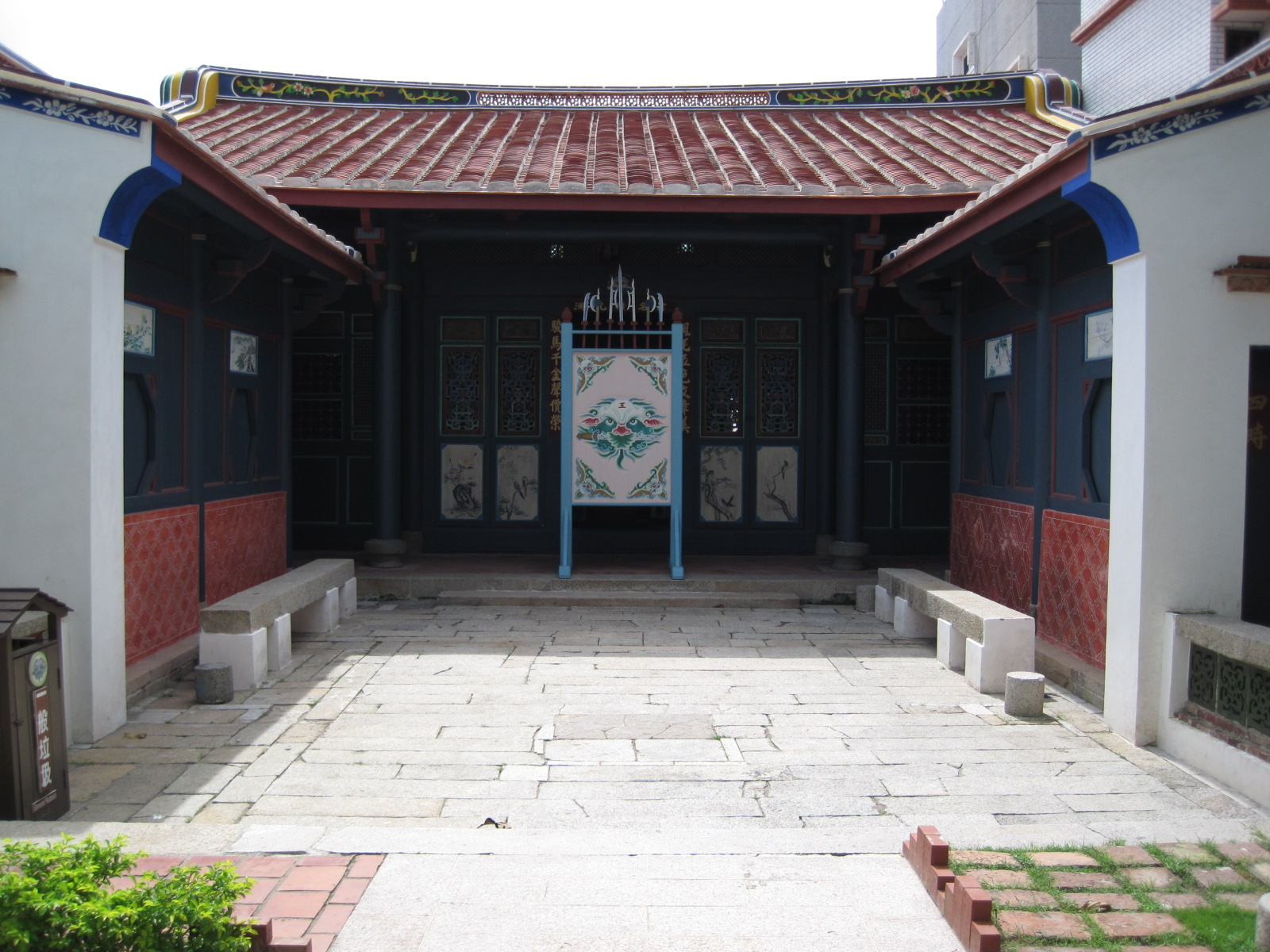
- Interactive map of the Haishan Hall area

General information
- Location: Anping, Tainan, Taiwan
- Coordinates: 23°00′05.6″N 120°09′45.6″E
- Completed: 1684

The Haishan Hall (traditional Chinese: 海山館; simplified Chinese: 海山馆; pinyin: Hǎishān Guǎn) is a former military assembly hall in Anping District, Tainan, Taiwan.

== Name ==
The hall was named Haishan taken from a mountain located in Pingtan Island, Fuzhou, Fujian.

== History ==
The hall was built in 1684 shortly after Qing Dynasty took over Taiwan. It used to be the gathering venue for soldiers coming from Haishan District of Fujian Province. Those soldiers were stationed in Taiwan to defend the island on a three year rotational shift. In 1975, the building was acquired by Tainan City Government from the descendant of 張金聲 who owned the house and converted into a museum in 1985.

== Exhibitions ==
The hall exhibits the implements and charms designed to ward off evil. Various folk and cultural artifacts were also displayed.

== Transportation ==
The hall is accessible by bus from Tainan Station of Taiwan Railway.

== See also ==
- Tianhou Temple (Anping)
- List of tourist attractions in Taiwan
