= Former Tait & Co. Merchant House =

Historic building in Anping, Tainan, Taiwan

Taiwan Development Historical Materials Wax Museum
- 台灣開拓史料蠟像館
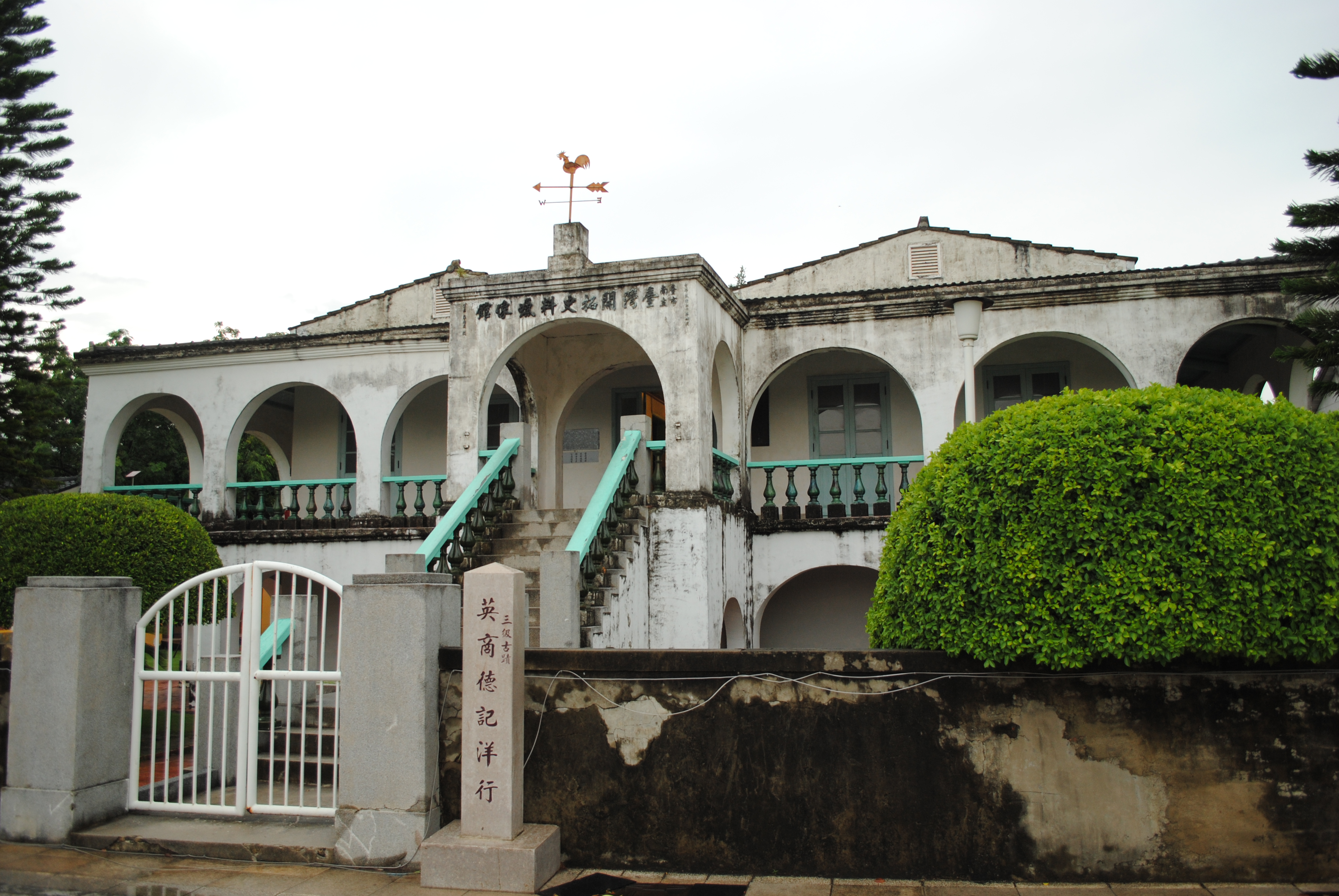
- Interactive map of the Taiwan Development Historical Materials Wax Museum area

General information
- Type: museum
- Location: Anping, Tainan, Taiwan
- Coordinates: 23°00′12.3″N 120°09′35.4″E
- Completed: 1867

Technical details
- Floor count: 2

The Taiwan Development Historical Materials Wax Museum (Traditional Chinese: 台灣開拓史料蠟像館) is a historical building in Anping District, Tainan, Taiwan.

== History ==
After the signing of Treaty of Tientsin for Qing Dynasty in June 1858 in Tianjin (Tientsin), Anping was one of the harbor in Taiwan which was opened for international trade. Trading company Tait & Company constructed the building in 1867 as their merchant house. During the Japanese rule, the building housed a salt company. After the handover of Taiwan from Japan to the Republic of China in 1945, the building became the office of Tainan Salt Works. In 1979, the building was transformed into a museum with the upper floor became the Taiwan Development Wax Museum. It was designated as class 3 historical building.

== Architecture ==
The two-story building was designed with western colonial style with white paint color. The ground floor was the workers dormitory with a center pathway and three rooms on each side. The upper floor has its arcade railing decorated with green glaze vase type of decoration. It also features a warehouse next to it which now has been turned into the Anping Tree House.

Front facade

view from the second floor

== Exhibitions ==
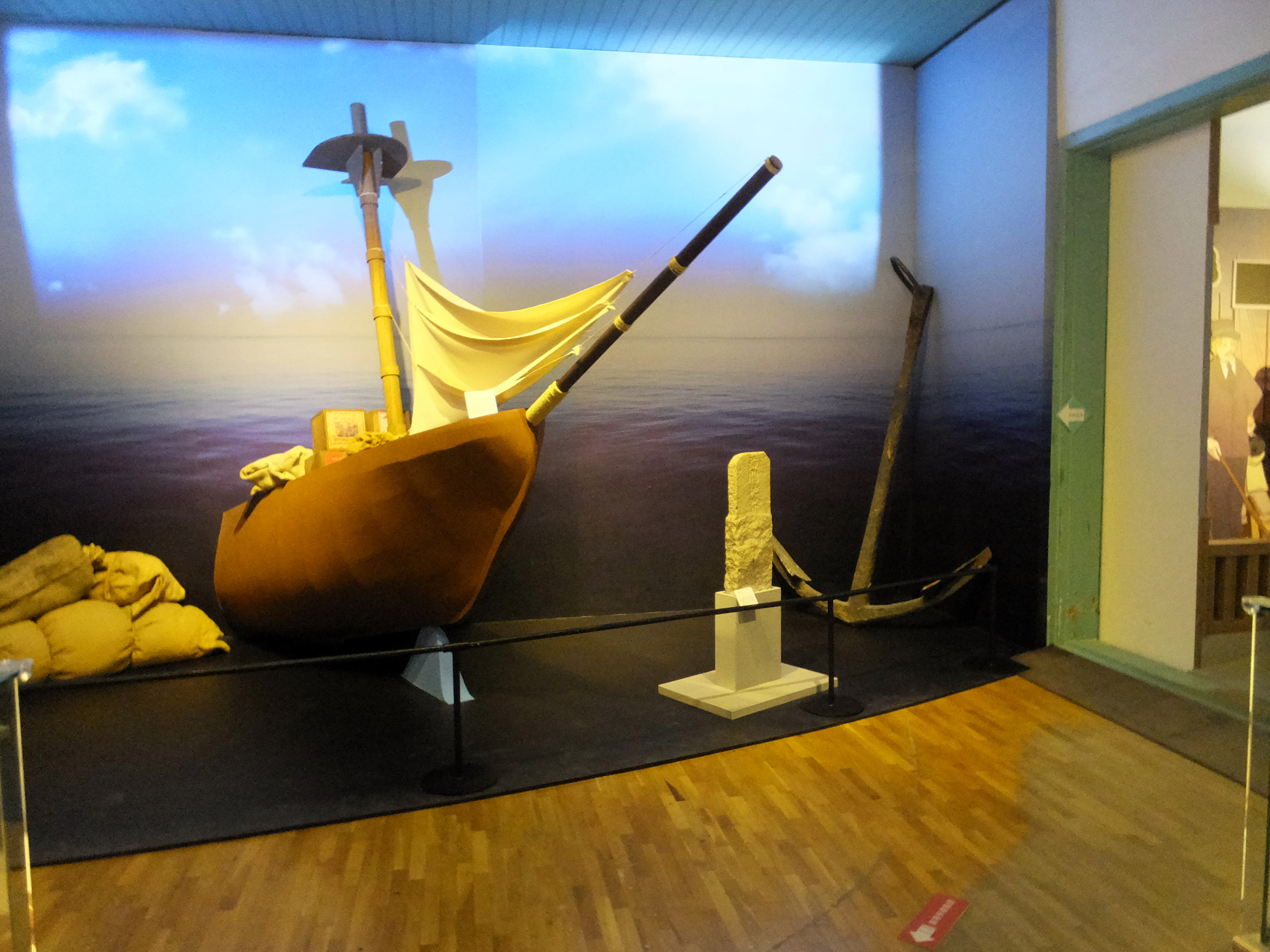
Former Tait & Co. Merchant House exhibition hall

The building displays the history of immigrants in Taiwan on the ground floor and also wax sculptures of humans, animals and artifacts on the upper floor.

== Transportation ==
The building is accessible by bus from Tainan Station of Taiwan Railway.

== See also ==
- List of tourist attractions in Taiwan
