= Antonius Hambroek =

Dutch missionary

- Antonius Hambrouck
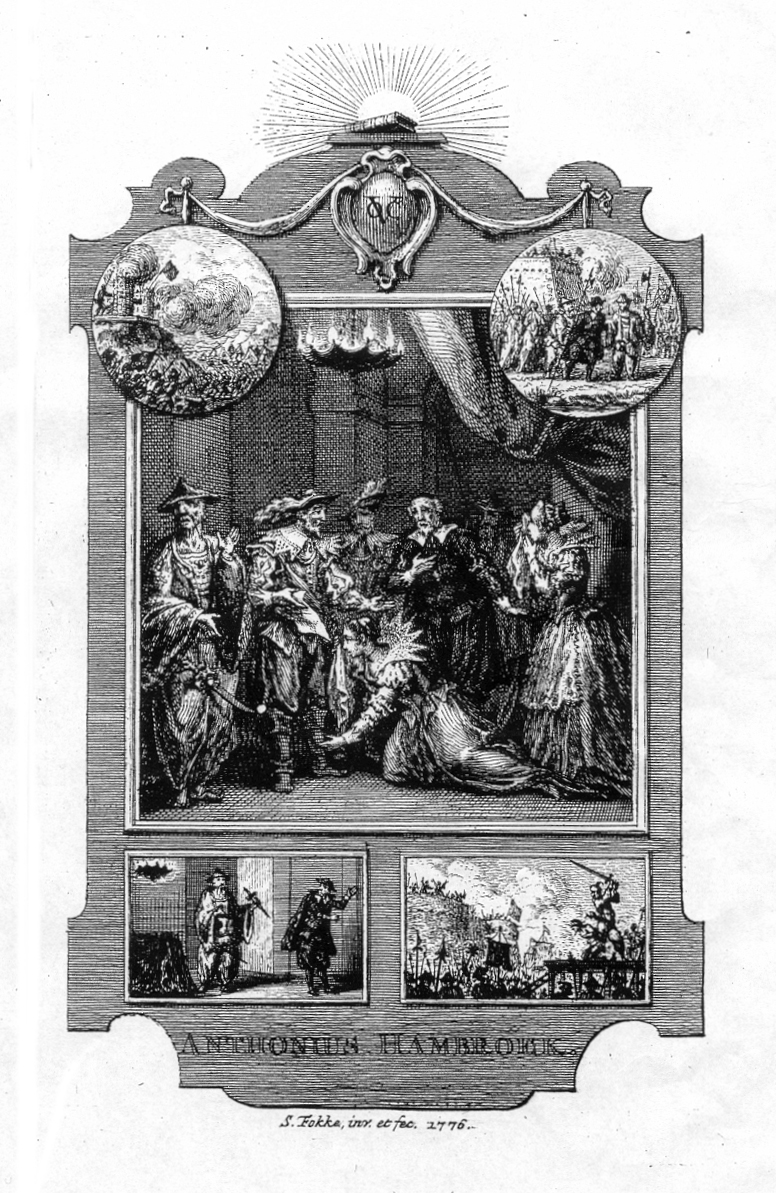

Personal life
- Born: 1607 Rotterdam, Dutch Republic
- Died: July 21, 1661 (aged 53–54) Formosa
- Spouse: Anna Vincenten Moij (m. 1632)
- Children: 4
- Education: University of Leiden

Religious life
- Religion: Christian
- Denomination: Dutch Reformed Church

Antonius Hambroek (1607 – July 21, 1661) was a Dutch Reformed missionary to Formosa from 1648 to 1661, during the Dutch colonial era. He was executed by Koxinga as the Chinese warlord wrested Formosa from the Dutch during the Siege of Fort Zeelandia.

== Early life ==
Born in Rotterdam in 1607, Hambroeck studied at the University of Leiden in 1624, where he would met his future wife Anna Vincenten Moij. After his appointment as a pastor in the village of Schipluiden, near Delft, they married on June 1, 1632. They had at least four children: three daughters and a son.

Hambroek was a minister in Schipluiden between 1632 and 1647, he accepted a request from the Admiral of the Dutch Navy Maarten Harpertszoon Tromp in the late 1637 or early 1638 as a preacher during the Dutch Navy’s ongoing battle against the Dunkirk privateers which took a few months.

In 1648, Hambroek arrived in Formosa to start his missionary work under the auspices of the VOC and was posted to the Mattau together with his wife and children.

== Siege of Fort Zeelandia and death ==
In 1661, the Ming warlord Koxinga took over Mattau, capturing many of the Dutch settlers, including Hambroek along with his wife, a son and a daughter. Then on May 24, 1661, Koxinga sent Hambroek as a messenger together with the interpreter Paulus Ossewayer and two Chinese interpreters, to Frederik Coyett, the Dutch Governor of Formosa, with a letter to demand the surrender of the Dutch garrison at Fort Zeelandia and the abandonment of their colony. Koxinga promised the missionary death should he return with a displeasing answer.

Once there at the fort both Ossewayer and Hambroek himself opposed with Coyett and the council the surrender of the fort, for which Covett agreed with their advice and refused to surrender. On the following day Hambroek bade his two married daughters farewell, who begged him in vain to stay with them.

Hambroek and the interpreters headed back to Koxinga's camp, where he was again placed in captivity. A few months later, Hambroek was executed by decapitation along with his son and others on July 21, 1661.

After the Siege of Fort Zeelandia, Koxinga allegedly took Hambroek's teenage daughter as a concubine. Other Dutch (or part Dutch) women were sold to Chinese soldiers to become their wives.

== Antonius Hambroek, or the Siege of Formosa ==
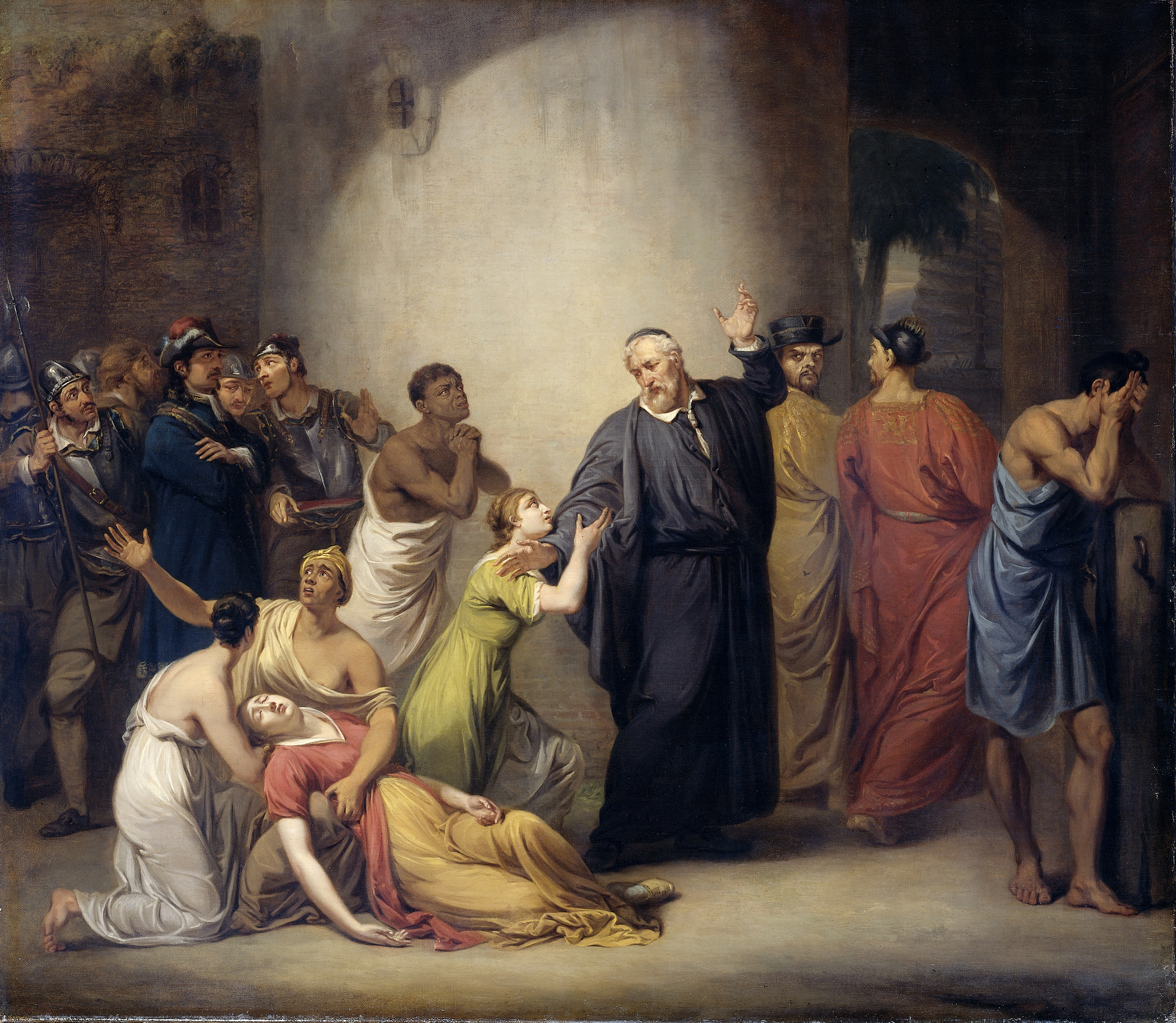
Antonius Hambroek takes leave of his daughters before being sent away, historical painting by Jan Willem Pieneman in 1810

The playwright Joannes Nomsz wrote a tragedy for the stage in 1775 about the martyrdom of Hambroek, "Antonius Hambroek, of de Belegering van Formoza" rendered in English as "Antonius Hambroek, or the Siege of Formosa", sealing the missionary's fame in Holland.
