= Anping Tree House =

Former warehouse in Anping, Tainan, Taiwan

- 安平樹屋
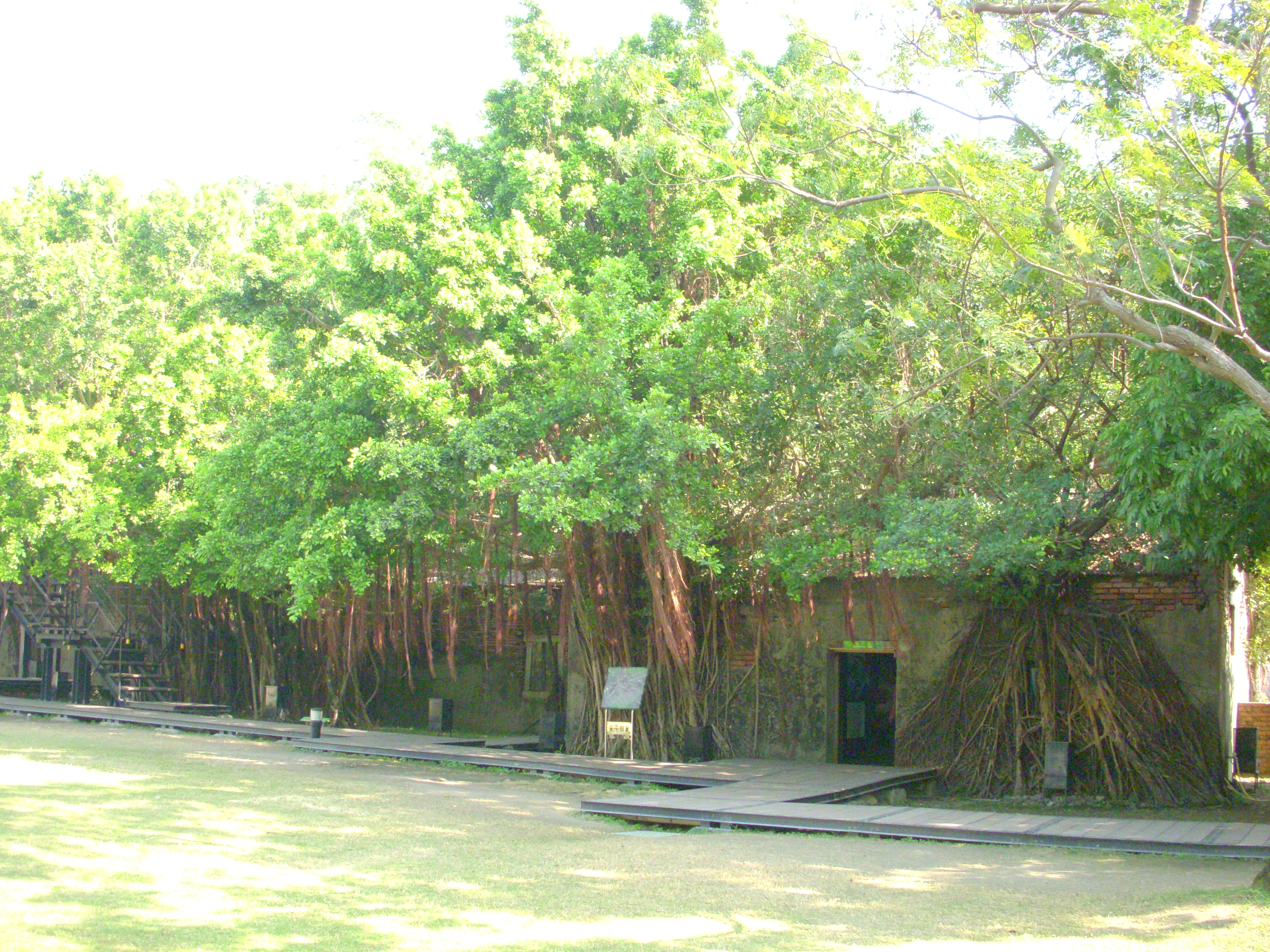
- Interactive map of the Anping Tree House area

General information
- Type: former warehouse
- Location: Anping, Tainan, Taiwan
- Coordinates: 23°00′13.5″N 120°09′35.3″E
- Opened: 2004

The Anping Tree House (traditional Chinese: 安平樹屋; simplified Chinese: 安平树屋; pinyin: Ānpíng Shùwū) is a former warehouse in Anping District, Tainan, Taiwan. The "treehouse" name refers to the living banyan roots and branches that cover the building.

Entrance of the Anping Tree House

Interior of the Anping Tree House

== History ==
=== Qing Dynasty ===
After the Qing government signed the Treaty of Tientsin in June 1858, Anping was one of the harbors in Taiwan which was opened to international trade. Trading company Tait & Company constructed a merchant house in 1867 as well as a warehouse. The company was involved in the export of granulated sugar and camphor. Before those goods were loaded into transport ships, they were stored inside the warehouse.

=== Empire of Japan ===
After the Empire of Japan came to Taiwan in 1895, they made the trading of camphor and opium a government business and left foreign merchants out of business and had to leave Taiwan, including Tait & Company. In 1911, the merchant house and the warehouse were turned into the office and warehouse of Japan Salt Company. Once the warehouse was abandoned, the banyan tree around it started to spread its branches and roots around the building.

=== Republic of China ===
After the handover of Taiwan from Japan to the Republic of China in 1945, the warehouse became the office for the Tainan Salt Works (Chinese: 台南鹽場). The building underwent renovation in 1981 to modernize the building. In 2004, the Tainan City Government invited designers to transform the warehouse into tourist object. They then built wood and metal staircases and viewing platforms for visitors to view the whole area. The warehouse was finally opened to the public in 2004 as the Anping Tree House as part of the National Anping Harbor Historic Park.

== Architecture ==
The tree house features a skyway above it for visitors to move around. It is covered by dense roots as its rooftop.

Stairs of the skyway

View from the skyway

== Transportation ==
The tree house is accessible by bus from Tainan Station of Taiwan Railway.

== See also ==
- List of tourist attractions in Taiwan
