= Anping District =

Coordinates: 22°59′36.52″N 120°9′53.47″E

Anping 安平區 An-peng
- District
- Anping District
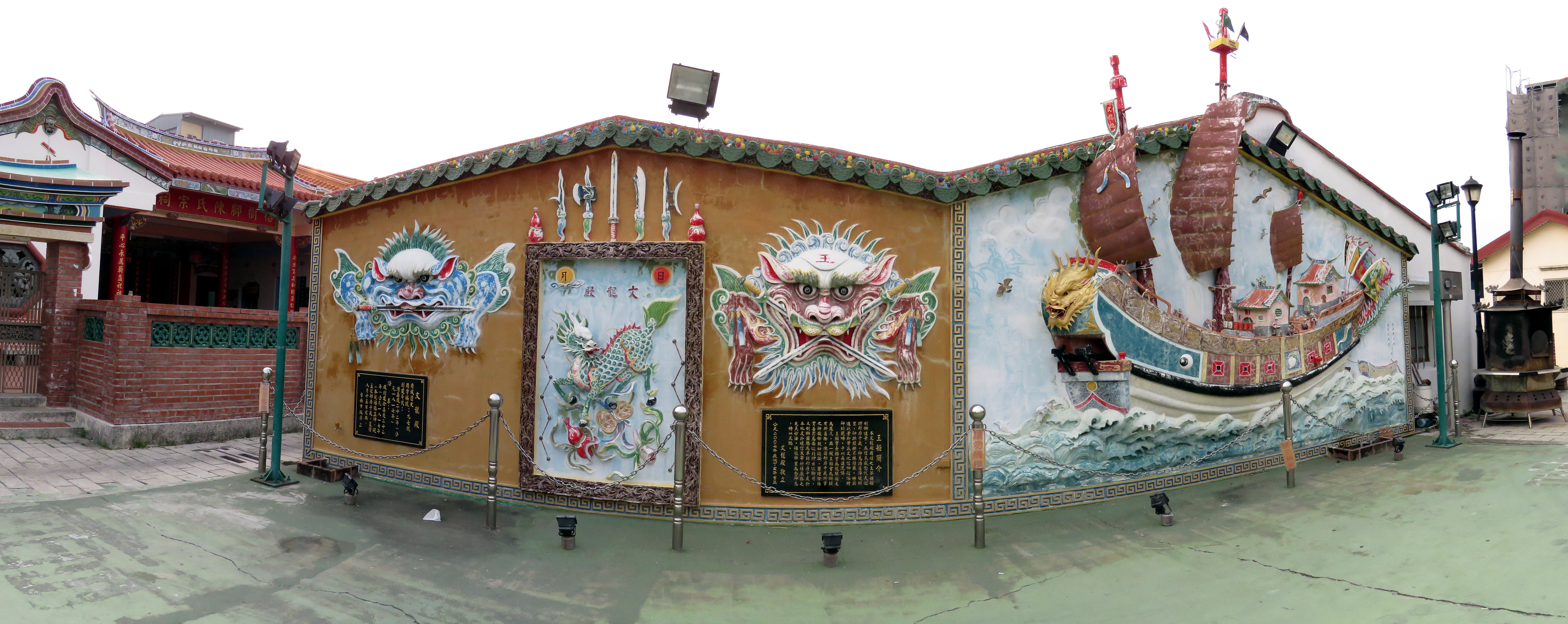
- Decorative walls in the back streets of Anping

- Anping within Tainan City
- Country: Taiwan
- Special municipality: Tainan

Government
  - District chief: Lin Guo-ming (林國明)

Area
  - Land: 11.07 km^{2} (4.27 sq mi)

Population (March 2023)
  - Total: 68,465
  - Density: 6,185/km^{2} (16,020/sq mi)
- Time zone: UTC+8 (National Standard Time)
- Postal code: 708
- Area code: 06
- Website: web.tainan.gov.tw/tnanping/ (in Chinese)

Anping
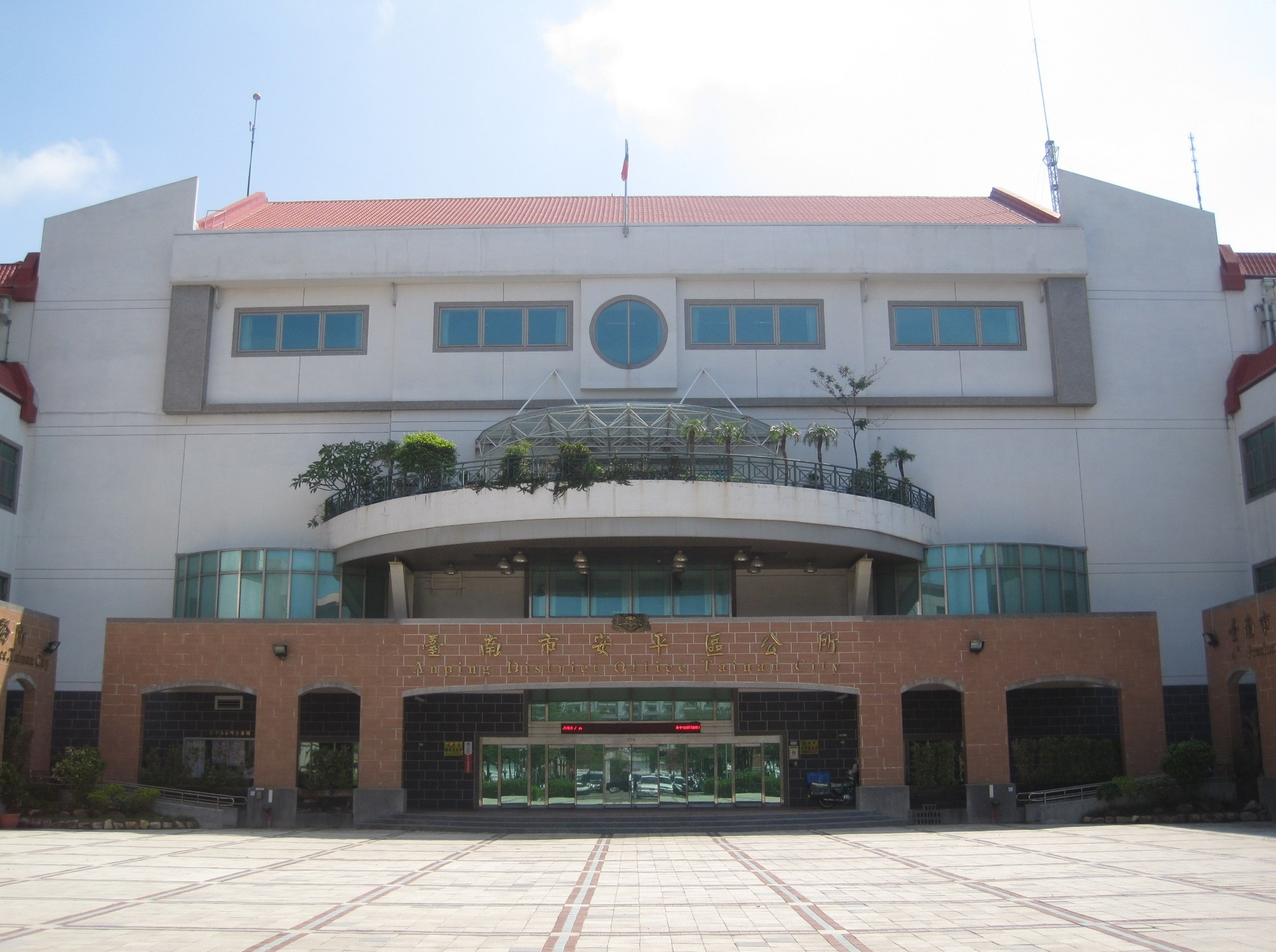
- Anping District office
- Chinese: 安平
Transcriptions
Standard Mandarin
- Hanyu Pinyin: Ānpíng
- Wade–Giles: An-p'ing
Southern Min
- Hokkien POJ: An-pêng

Anping District is a district of Tainan, Taiwan. In March 2012, it was named one of the Top 10 Small Tourist Towns by the Tourism Bureau of Taiwan. It is home to 64,408 people according to the 2020 census.

== Name ==
The older place name of Tayouan derives from the ethnonym of a nearby Taiwanese aboriginal tribe, and was written by the Dutch and Portuguese variously as Taiouwang, Tayowan, etc. In his translations of Dutch records, missionary William Campbell used the variant Tayouan and wrote that Taoan and Taiwan also occur. As Dutch spelling varied greatly at the time (see: History of Dutch orthography), other variants may be seen. The name was also transliterated into Chinese characters variously as 臺窩灣, 大灣, 臺員, 大員, 大圓 and 梯窩灣.

After the Dutch were ousted c. 1661 by Koxinga, Han immigrants renamed the area "Anping" after the Anping Bridge in Quanzhou, Fujian. Soon after Qing rule was established in 1683, the name "Taiwan" (臺灣) was officially used to refer to the whole island with the establishment of Taiwan Prefecture.

== History ==
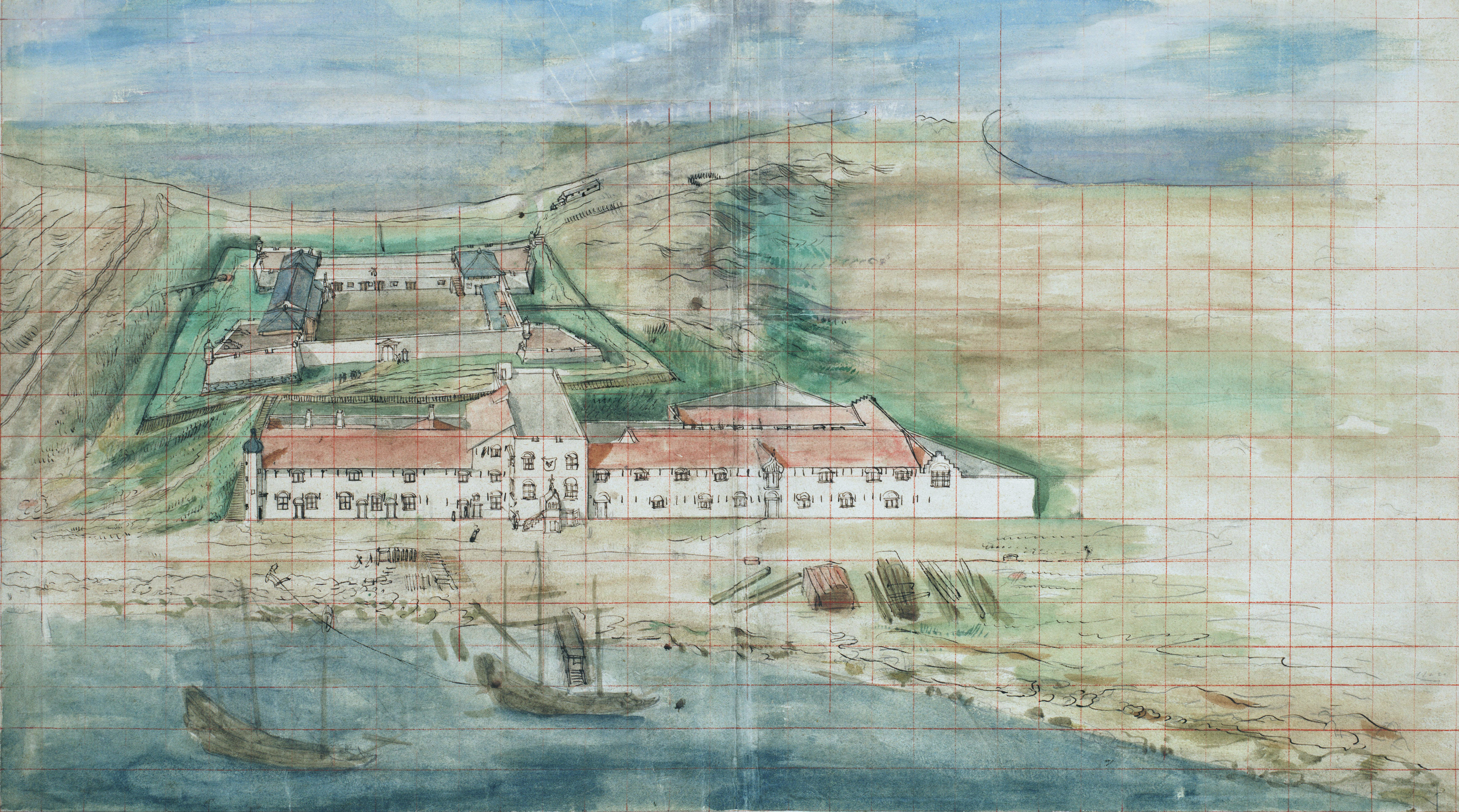
Fort Zeelandia painted around 1635, The Hague National Bureau of Archives

The history of Anping dates back to the 17th century, when the Dutch East India Company occupied a "high sandy down" called Tayouan and built Fort Zeelandia. The Dutch moved their headquarters to Tayouan after leaving the Pescadores in 1624. Due to silting, the islet has joined with mainland Taiwan.

Koxinga's army brought an end to the Dutch colonial period via the Siege of Fort Zeelandia.

In the Japanese period, the history of trade between China and Japan unfolded at Anping. According to the 1904 census, the city's population was 5,972.

== Administrative divisions ==
The district consists of Jincheng, Yuguang, Jianping, Yiping, Huaping, Pingtong, Wenping, Guoping, Yuping, Yizai, Pingan, Tianfei and Wangcheng Village.

== Government institutions ==
- Tainan City Government
- Tainan City Council

== Tourist attractions ==
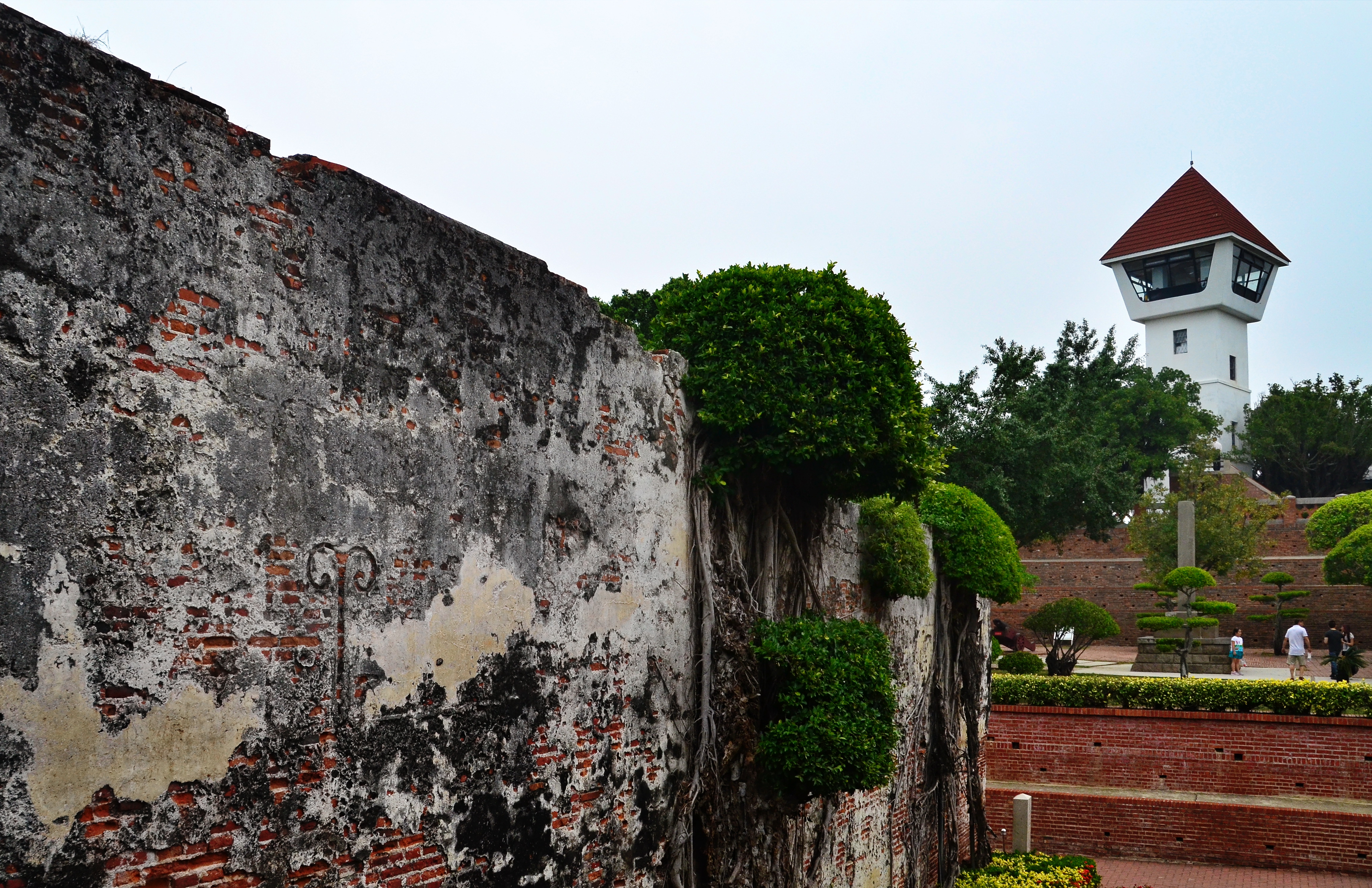
The remains of Fort Zeelandia

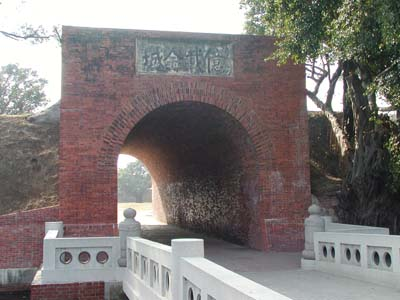
Gate of the Eternal Golden Castle

- Anping Old Street
- Anping Small Fort
- Anping Tree House
- Cahamu Indigenous People Park
- Canal Museum
- Eternal Golden Castle
- Former Tait & Co. Merchant House
- Fort Zeelandia
- Haishan Hall
- Tianhou Temple
- Anping Oyster Shell Cement Kiln Museum
- Miaoshou Temple
- Yanping Street Old Well
- USS Sarsfield (aka ROCS Te Yang) museum ship
