= Anping Small Fort =

Former fort in Anping, Tainan, Taiwan

- 安平小砲臺
- Anping, Tainan, Taiwan
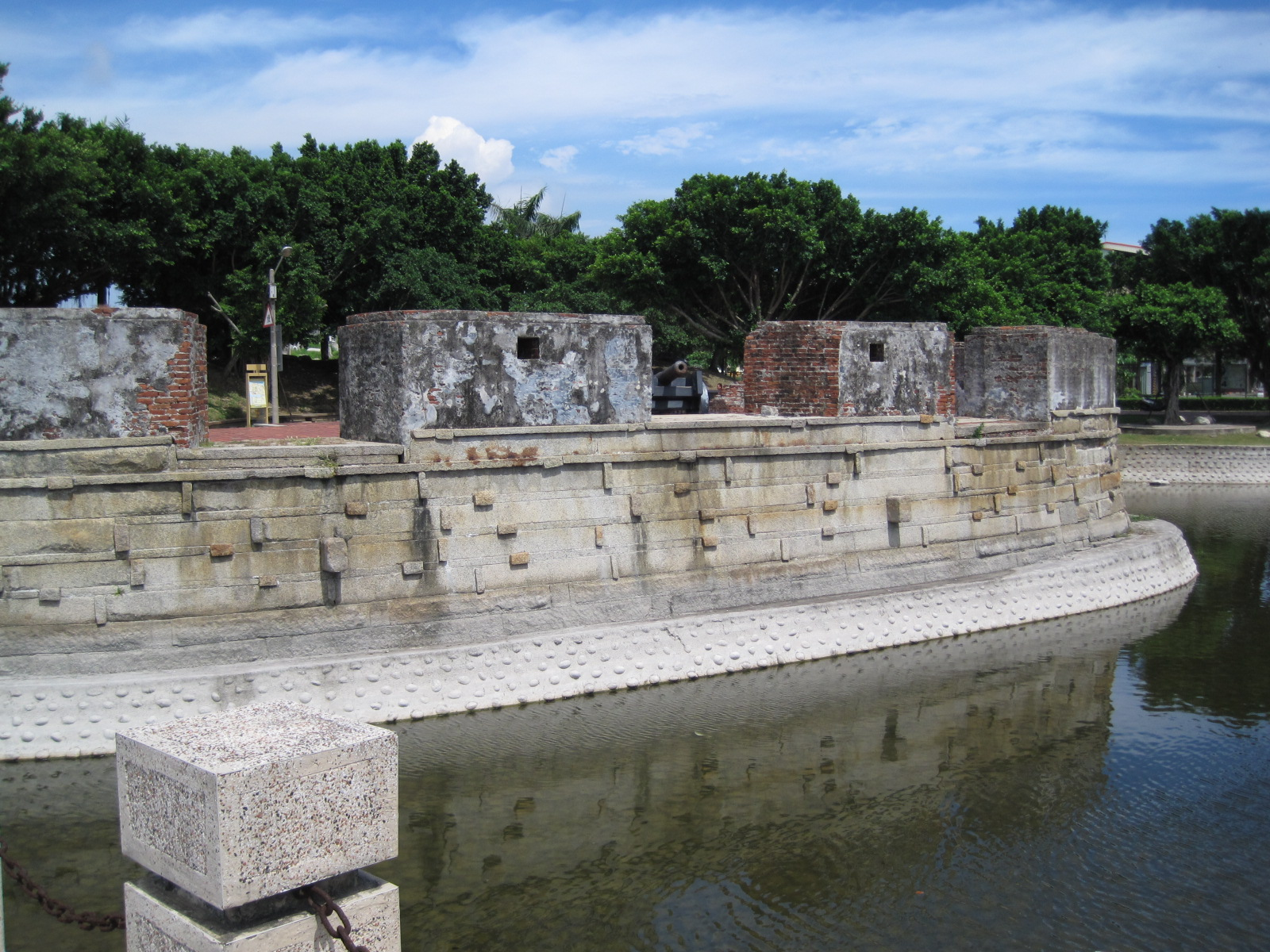

Site information
- Type: fort

Location
- Coordinates: 22°59′58.3″N 120°09′30.9″E

Site history
- Built: 1840

The Anping Small Fort (traditional Chinese: 安平小砲臺; simplified Chinese: 安平小炮台; pinyin: Ānpíng Xiǎo Pàotái) is a former fort in Anping District, Tainan, Taiwan.

== History ==
The fort was built to prevent the invasion from British Empire during the Opium War. It was built by Yao Ying (Chinese: 姚瑩) in 1844. In 1949, the Republic of China Armed Forces built a bunker at the fort. In 1990, the fort underwent renovation.

== Architecture ==
The fort represents the latest period of Chinese old style.

== Gallery ==
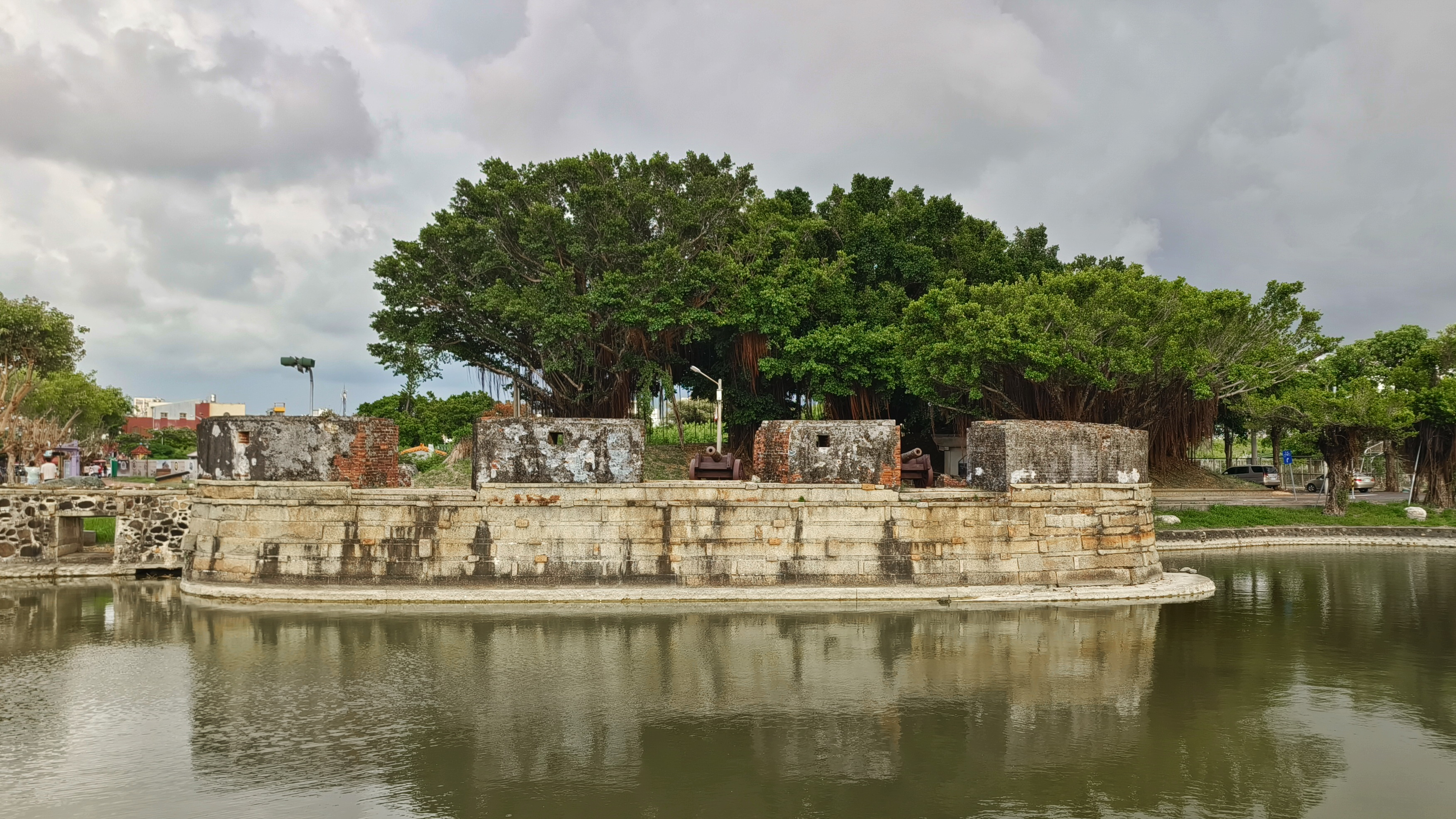

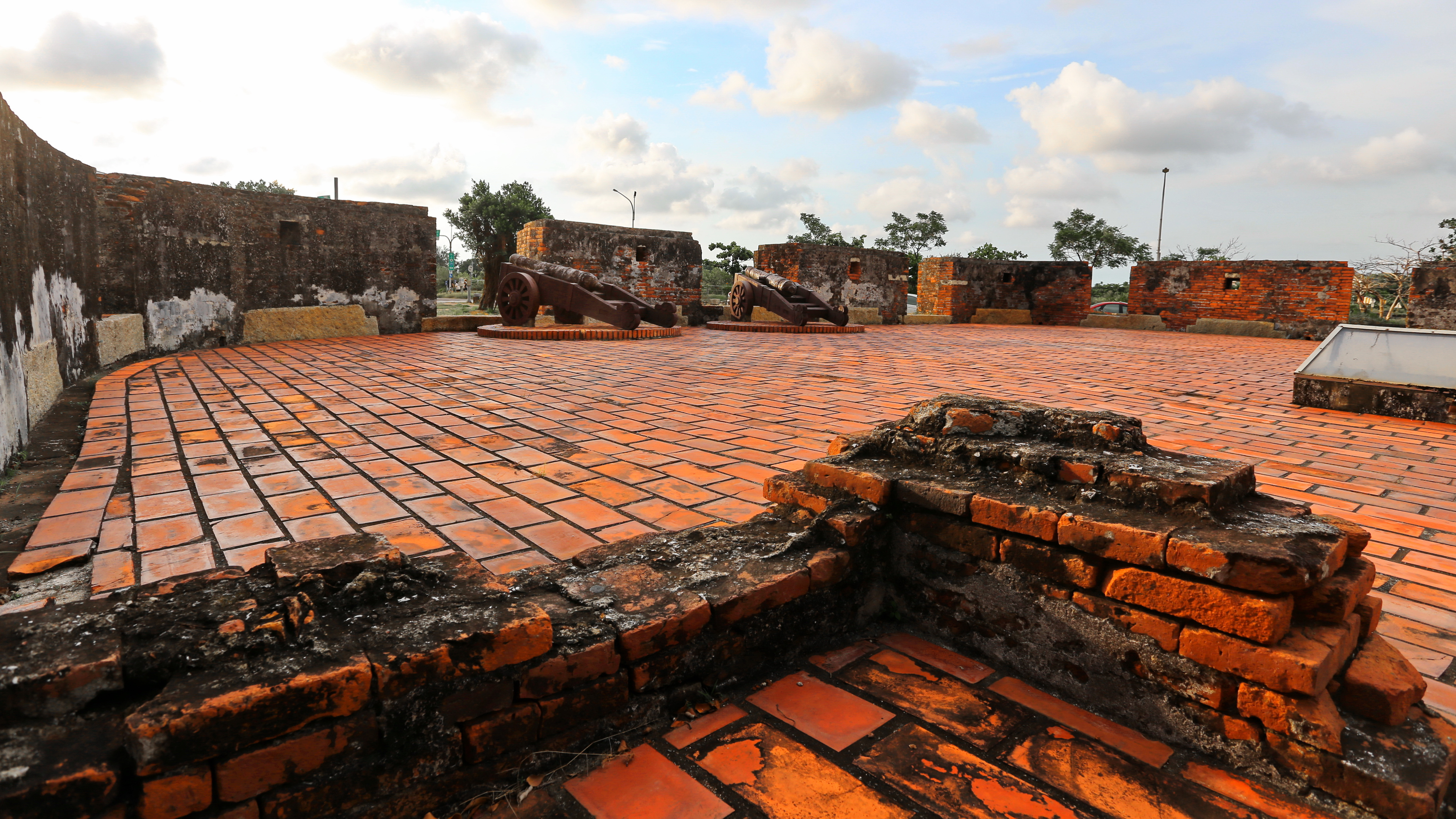

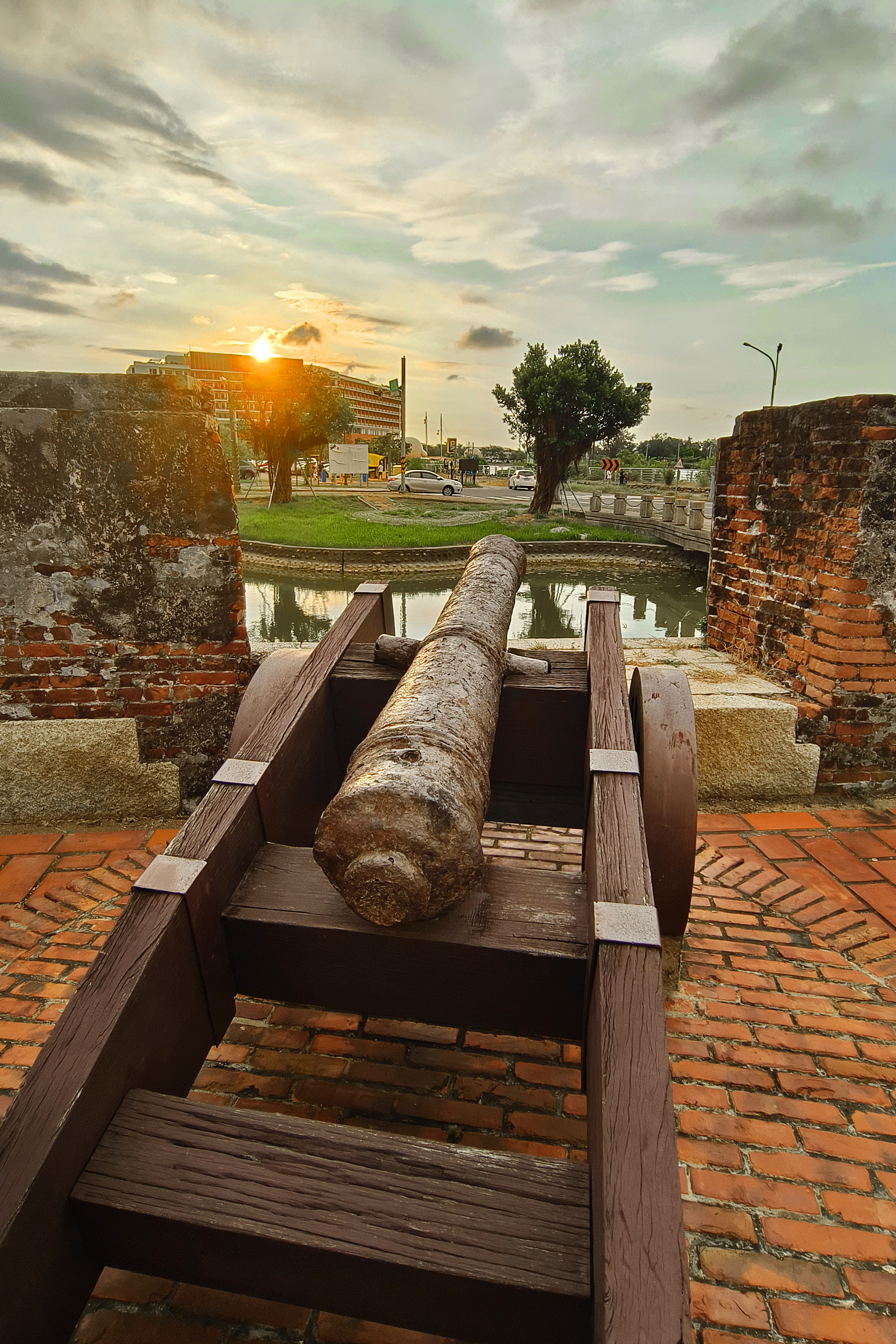

== See also ==
- List of tourist attractions in Taiwan
- Fort Zeelandia (Taiwan)
