= Canal Museum (Taiwan) =

Museum in Anping, Tainan, Taiwan

- 運河博物館
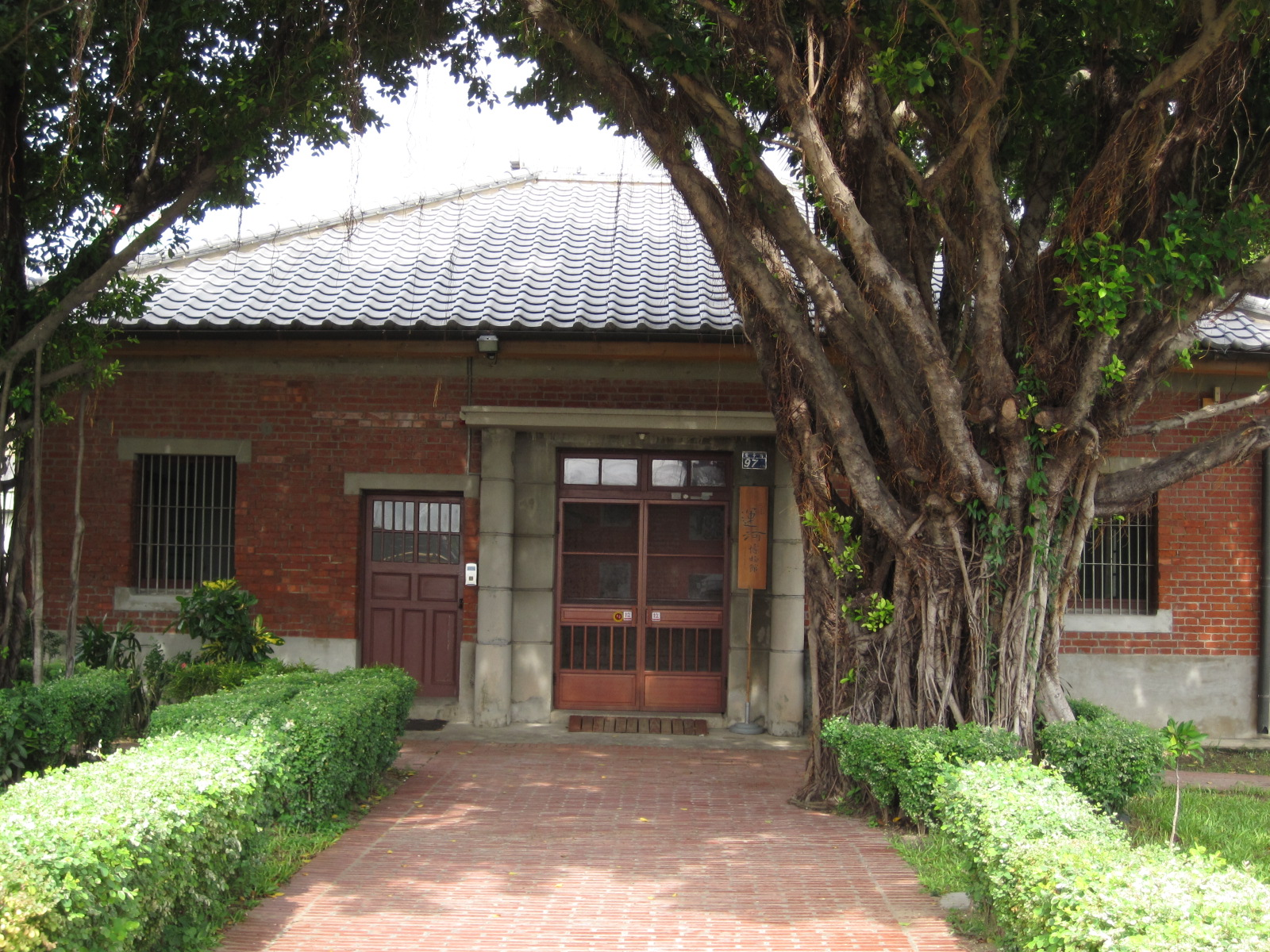
- Former name: Anping Customs
- Established: February 2005
- Location: Anping, Tainan, Taiwan
- Coordinates: 22°59′54.7″N 120°9′50.2″E
- Type: museum

The Canal Museum (traditional Chinese: 運河博物館; simplified Chinese: 运河博物馆; pinyin: Yùnhé Bówùguǎn) is a museum in Anping District, Tainan, Taiwan.

== History ==
The museum building was originally constructed in 1926 as the Anping Customs building. It was the place where docked ships paid tariffs when arriving or leaving Anping. In 2003, the building was declared a historical monument and converted into the Canal Museum. In February 2005, the museum was officially opened to public.

== Architecture ==
The museum building is a Japanese-style building with two banyan trees in front yard and decorated with black brick roof and red brick wall.

== See also ==
- List of museums in Taiwan
- Tainan Canal
