= Siege of Fort Zeelandia =

1661–62 Ming victory in Taiwan over the Dutch

- Part of the Sino-Dutch conflicts
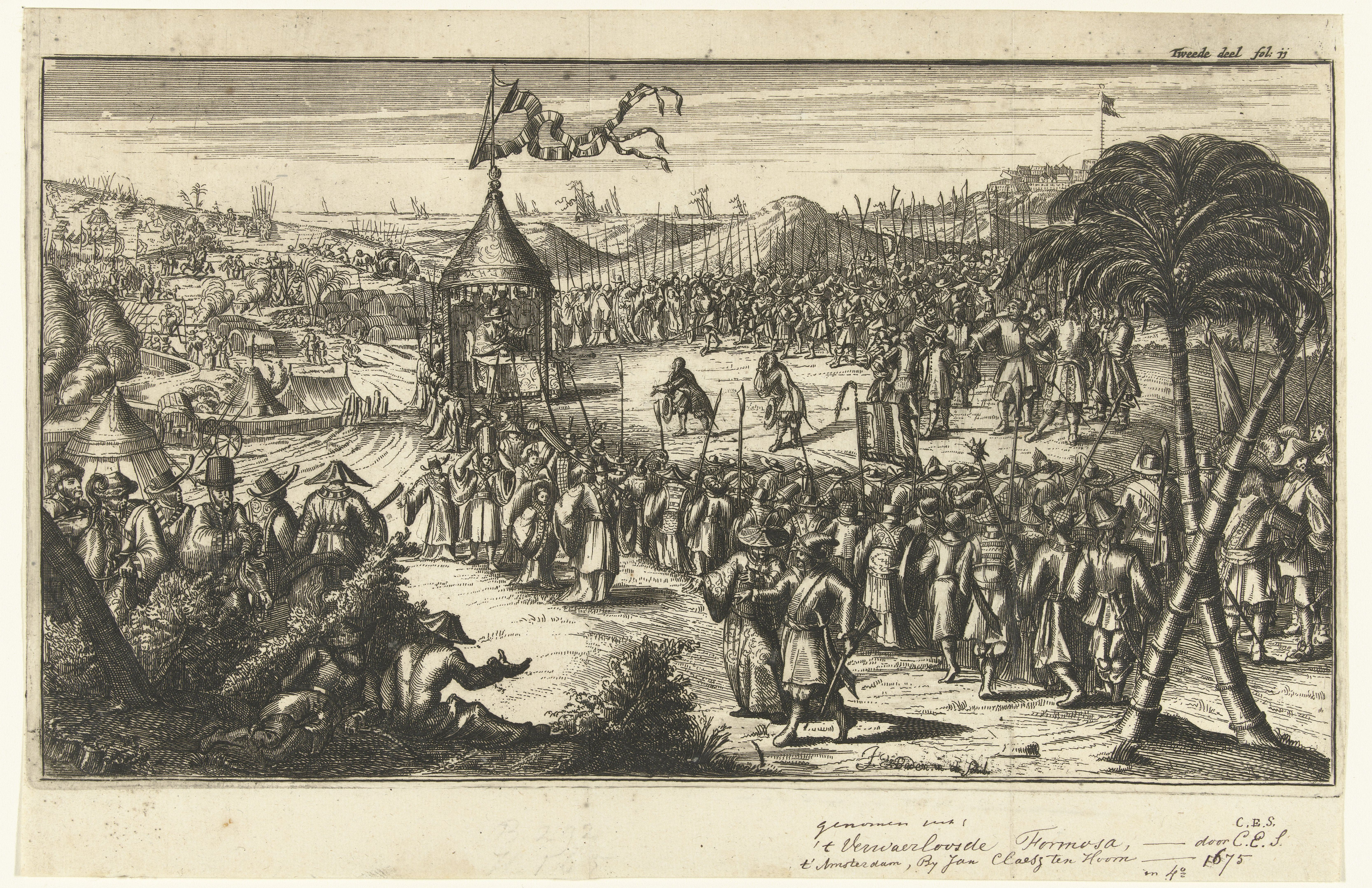
- Surrender of Fort Zeelandia in Formosa to the Ming loyalists, 1662 by Johannes van Baden
Date	March 30, 1661 – February 1, 1662
Location	Fort Zeelandia, Tainan, Formosa (modern Taiwan) 23°00′06″N 120°09′39″E
Result	Ming loyalists victory

Belligerents
Ming loyalists	Dutch East India Company

Commanders and leaders
Koxinga; Chen Ze	Frederick Coyett; Hans Jurgen Radis; Philip Meij

Strength
25,000, of whom 6,000 advanced on the fort 400 junks	905 soldiers (Zeelandia); 140 soldiers (Provintia); 3 ships (Zeelandia); 12 ships (relief) with 700 sailors

Casualties and losses
12,500 deserted or dead, mostly from disease, including more than 2,200 killed by natives	1,600 killed or died of disease Zeelandia: 1 warship sunk Relief: 1 warship sunk, 2 ships abandoned, 3 ships captured

Chinese name
- Chinese: 热兰遮城包围战
- Traditional Chinese: 熱蘭遮城包圍戰
- Literal meaning: Siege of Fort Zeelandia
Transcriptions
Standard Mandarin
- Hanyu Pinyin: Rèlánzhē chéng bāowéi zhàn
Southern Min
- Hokkien POJ: Jia̍t-lân-jia Siâⁿ Pau-ûi-chiàn
- Location within Taiwan

The siege of Fort Zeelandia of 1661–1662 ended the Dutch East India Company's rule over Taiwan and began the Kingdom of Tungning's rule over the island.

== Prelude ==
From 1623 to 1624, the Dutch had been at war with Ming China over the Pescadores. In 1633 they clashed with a fleet led by Zheng Zhilong in the Battle of Liaoluo Bay, ending in Dutch defeat. By 1632 the Dutch had established a post on a peninsula named Tayoan (now Anping District of Tainan), which was separated from the main part of Formosa by a shallow lagoon historically referred to as the Taikang inland sea. The Dutch fortifications consisted of two forts along the bay: the first and foremost fortification was the multiple-walled Fort Zeelandia, situated at the entrance to the bay, while the second was the smaller Fort Provintia, a walled administrative office. Frederick Coyett, the governor of Taiwan for the Dutch East India Company, was stationed in Fort Zeelandia with 1,733 people: 905 soldiers and officers, 547 slaves, 218 women and children, and 63 married men, while his subordinate, Valentyn, was in charge of Fort Provintia and its garrison of 140 soldiers.

In 1659, after an unsuccessful attempt to capture Nanjing, Koxinga, son of Zheng Zhilong and leader of the Ming loyalist remnants, felt that the Qing Empire had consolidated their position in China sufficiently, while his troops needed more supplies and soldiers. He began searching for a suitable location as his base of operations, and soon a Chinese man named He Bin (Chinese: 何斌), who was working for the Dutch East India Company in Formosa (Taiwan), fled to Koxinga's base in Xiamen and provided him with a map of Taiwan.

== Koxinga's invasion ==
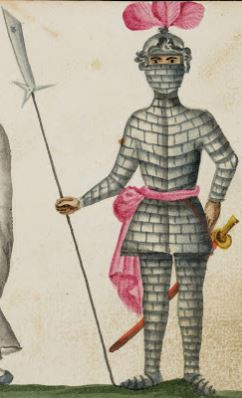
One of Koxinga's armored soldiers.

=== Landing ===
On 23 March 1661, Koxinga's fleet set sail from Kinmen (Quemoy) with hundreds of junks of various sizes, with roughly 25,000 soldiers and sailors aboard. They arrived at Penghu the next day. On 30 March, a small garrison was left at Penghu while the main body of the fleet left and arrived at Tayoan on 2 April. On Baxemboy Island in the Bay of Taiwan, unrelated to the siege, a Chinese force of 2,000 soldiers attacked and routed 240 Dutch musketeers. After passing through a shallow waterway unknown to the Dutch, the main body of Koxinga's invasion fleet landed at the bay of Lakjemuyse. Three Dutch ships attacked the Chinese junks and destroyed several until their main warship, the Hector, exploded due to a cannon firing near its gunpowder supply. The remaining two ships consisted of a yacht and a lesser warship, which could not keep Koxinga from controlling the waters around Taiwan. No further opposition was for the time encountered. The remainder of Koxinga's men safely landed and built earthworks overlooking the plain.

Some were armed with bows and arrows hanging down their backs; others had nothing save a shield on the left arm and a good sword in the right hand; while many wielded with both hands a formidable battle-sword fixed to a stick half the length of a man. Everyone was protected over the upper part of the body with a coat of iron scales, fitting below one another like the slates of a roof; the arms and legs being left bare. This afforded complete protection from rifle bullets and yet left ample freedom to move, as those coats only reached down to the knees and were very flexible at all the joints. The archers formed Koxinga's best troops, and much depended on them, for even at a distance they contrived to handle their weapons with so great skill that they very nearly eclipsed the riflemen. The shield bearers were used instead of cavalry. Every tenth man of them is a leader, who takes charge of, and presses his men on, to force themselves into the ranks of the enemy. With bent heads and their bodies hidden behind the shields, they try to break through the opposing ranks with such fury and dauntless courage as if each one had still a spare body left at home. They continually press onwards, notwithstanding many are shot down; not stopping to consider, but ever rushing forward like mad dogs, not even looking round to see whether they are followed by their comrades or not. Those with the sword-sticks—called soapknives by the Hollanders—render the same service as our lancers in preventing all breaking through of the enemy, and in this way establishing perfect order in the ranks; but when the enemy has been thrown into disorder, the Sword-bearers follow this up with fearful massacre amongst the fugitives.

Koxinga was abundantly provided with cannons and ammunition . . He had also two companies of 'Black-boys,' many of whom had been Dutch slaves and had learned the use of the rifle and musket-arms. These caused much harm during the war in Formosa.

The latter courageously marched in rows of twelve men towards the enemy, and when they came near enough, they charged by firing three volleys uniformly. The enemy, not less brave, discharged so great a storm of arrows that they seemed to darken the sky. From both sides some few fell hors de combat, but still the Chinese were not going to run away, as was imagined. The Dutch troops now noticed the separated Chinese squadron which came to surprise them from the rear; and seeing that those in front stubbornly held their ground, it now became a case of sero sapiunt Phryges. They now discovered that they had been too confident of the weakness of the enemy, and had not anticipated such resistance. If they were courageous before the battle (seeking to emulate the actions of Gideon), fear now took the place of their courage, and many of them threw down their rifles without even discharging them at the enemy. Indeed, they took to their heels, with shameful haste, leaving their brave comrades and valiant Captain in the lurch. Pedel, judging that it would be the veriest folly to withstand such overwhelming numbers, wished to close together and retreat in good order, but his soldiers would not listen to him. Fear had the upper-hand, and life was dear to them; each therefore sought to save himself. The Chinese saw the disorder and attacked still more vigorously, cutting down all before them. They gave no quarter, but went on until the Captain with one hundred and eighteen of his army were slain on the field of battle, as a penalty for making light of the enemy. Other misfortunes befell this unhappy company. A large number of the rifles in possession of our troops were left behind. This battle was fought on a sandy plain, from which escape was impossible, and but for the proximity of the pilot-boat, which lay close to the shore, not one would have been left to tell the tale. The fugitives, who had to wade up to their throats in water, were conveyed to Tayouan.

But it was observed that the greatest part of the hostile army—which, according to one of the prisoners, amounted to twenty thousand men, Koxinga himself being present—had already landed on the Sakam shore. To all appearance they would probably resist, pursue, and defeat us, seeing that they had a large force of cavalry, and were armed with rifles, soapknives, bows and arrows, and such like weapons, besides being harnessed and provided with storm-helmets.

— Frederick Coyett

=== Siege ===
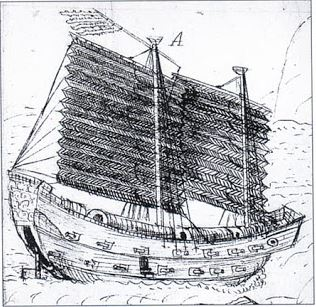
A Ming junk, 1637.

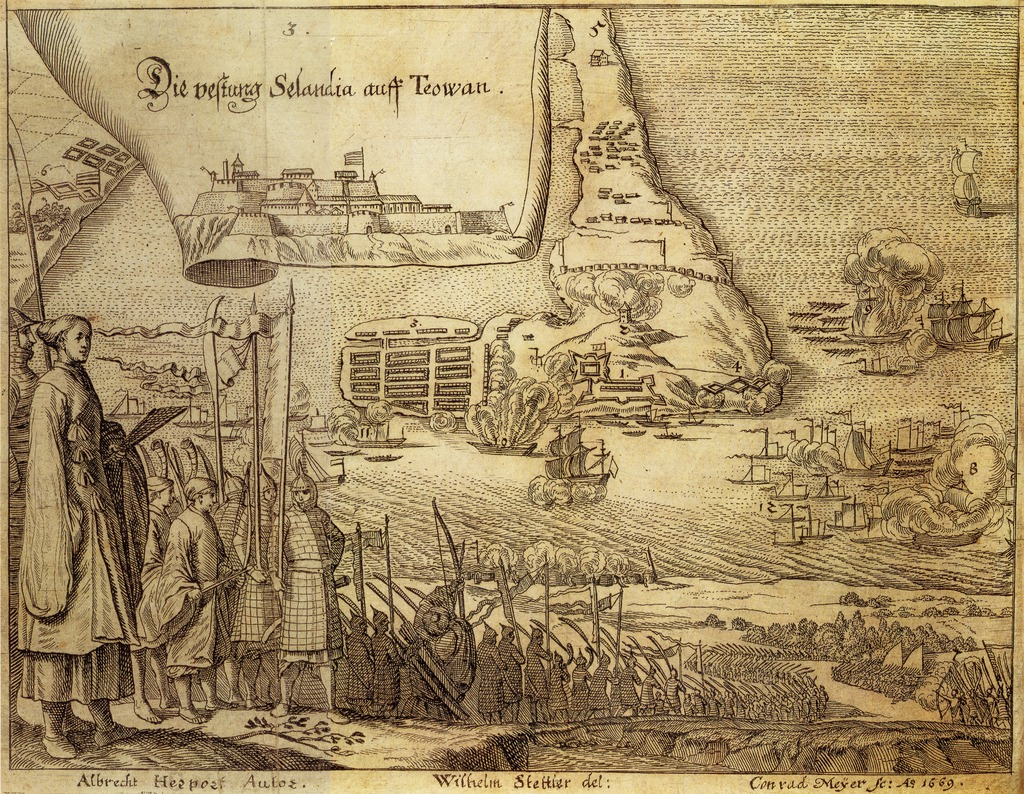
Surrender of Fort Zeelandia

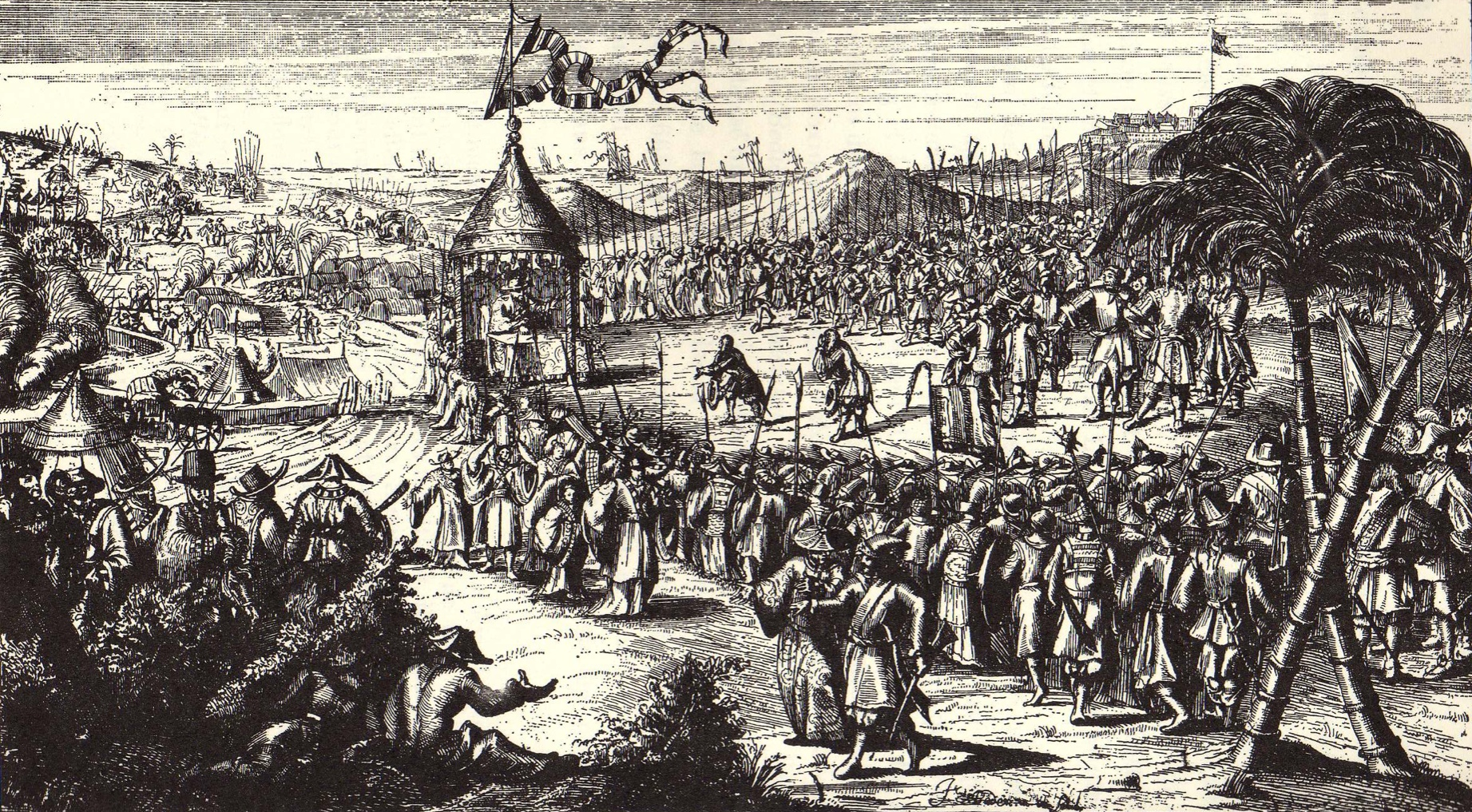
The surrender of Fort Zeelandia

On April 4, Valentyn surrendered to Koxinga's army after it laid siege to Fort Provintia. The rapid assault had caught Valentyn unprepared since he was under the impression that the fort was under the protection of Fort Zeelandia. On April 7, Koxinga's army surrounded Fort Zeelandia, sending the captured Dutch priest Antonius Hambroek as an emissary, demanding the garrison's surrender. However, Hambroek urged the garrison to resist instead of surrender and was executed after returning to Koxinga's camp. Koxinga ordered his artillery to advance and used 28 cannons to bombard the fort. Koxinga was aided by a musketeer regiment of former Portuguese and Dutch slaves.

Koxinga was confident in his army's ability to overwhelm the fort. They outnumbered the defenders twenty-to-one and he had hundreds of cannons. After careful planning and multiple feints, Koxinga bombarded the fort during the night, demolishing the roof of the Dutch governor's house. While initially unable to respond, the Dutch were able to reposition their guns and return fire from different angles using the bastion forts as vantage points. The assault was driven back with hundreds of Koxinga's best soldiers killed. The Dutch governor wrote that the enemy's cannons were badly placed, unprotected, and easy to destroy. The assault had caused no damage other than damaging a few houses and lightly wounding one Dutch artillerist. Shocked at the defeat, Koxinga abandoned the approach of taking the fortress by storm in favor of starving it out.

On the 28th of May, news of the siege reached Jakarta, and the Dutch East India Company dispatched a fleet of 12 ships and 700 sailors to relieve the fort. The first time they tried to land, they were forced away by bad weather, and one ship's crew was captured by the natives when it crashed into the beach. The natives killed most of the crew and sent them to Koxinga. On July 5, the relief force arrived and engaged in small-scale confrontations with Koxinga's fleet. On July 23, the two sides gave major battle as the Dutch fleet attempted to break Koxinga's blockade. A second, ultimately unsuccessful attempt at relief was mounted in October. The Dutch tried to bombard the Chinese position with their ships, but their shots were too high and missed their target, giving the Chinese gunners time to prepare and return fire. Meanwhile, the smaller Dutch ships engaged the Chinese junks, which lured them into a narrow strait with a false withdrawal. The Dutch ships were unable to get away as the wind had died, and they were forced to paddle their boats, but the Chinese caught them and massacred the crew on board, and used pikes to kill those who jumped overboard. The Chinese caught Dutch grenades in nets and threw them back at the Dutch. The Dutch flagship Koukercken ran aground right in front of an enemy cannon placement and was sunk. Another ship was stranded and its crew fled to Fort Zeelandia. The remaining Dutch fleet was forced to retreat with the loss of two ships, three smaller vessels, and 130 casualties.

In September, Koxinga attacked the Dutch redoubts with intent to capture them. Coyet remarked on the accuracy of Chinese cannon bombardment against Dutch gun emplacements on the fort, which rendered them immobile. Dutch carpenters tried to build a fortification at the base of the redoubt but failed due to enemy cannon fire. Coyet ordered 50 musketeers to provide cover fire and clear the Chinese gunners. They were successful, but during night time, the Chinese returned and mined the musketeers' positions with explosive charges. However they went off too early the next day while the musketeers were returning to their positions and failed to kill them. The Dutch were able to fortify the redoubt.

In October, several dozen Dutch troops raided a nearby island for provisions. The raid took a disastrous turn when they encountered a small group of Chinese soldiers. They tried to flee, but suffered heavy casualties, losing 36 men.

In December, deserting German mercenaries brought Koxinga word of low morale among the garrison, and he launched a major assault on the fort, which was ultimately repelled. In January 1662, a German sergeant named Hans Jurgen Radis defected to give Koxinga critical advice on how to capture the fortress from a redoubt whose strategic importance had gone hitherto unnoticed by the Chinese forces. Koxinga followed his advice and the Dutch redoubt fell within a day. This claim of a defector appears in a post hoc account of the siege written by Frederick Coyett, whom scholars have noted sought to absolve the author of responsibility for the defeat. A Swiss soldier also writes about the betrayal independently. Ming records make no mention of any defector or German named Hans Jurgen Radis.

On 12 January 1662, Koxinga's fleet initiated another bombardment, while the ground forces prepared to assault the fort. With supplies dwindling and no sign of reinforcement, Coyett finally ordered the hoisting of the white flag and negotiated terms of surrender, a process that was finalized on February 1. On the 9th of February, the remaining Dutch East India Company personnel left Taiwan; all were allowed to take with them their personal belongings, as well as provisions sufficient for them to reach the nearest Dutch settlement.

=== Torture ===
Both sides used torture in the war. One Dutch physician carried out a vivisection on a Chinese prisoner. The Chinese amputated the genitals, noses, ears, and limbs of Dutch prisoners while they were still alive and sent back the mutilated corpses and prisoners to the Dutch. Chinese rebels had earlier cut the genitals, eyes, ears, and noses of Dutch people in the Guo Huaiyi rebellion. The mouths of Dutch soldiers were filled with their amputated genitals by the Chinese who also slammed nails into their bodies, and amputated their noses, legs, and arms and sent the bodies of these Dutch soldiers back to the fort.

=== Taiwanese indigenous peoples ===
The Taiwanese indigenous peoples initially allied with the Dutch and fought against the invading Chinese. In the Kingdom of Middag, the natives appeared to warmly welcome troops led by Koxinga's commander, Chen Ze. After luring Chen Ze's troops into a false sense of security, the natives attacked while most were sleeping, killing 1,500. A separate native ambush in southern Taiwan wiped out a Koxinga force of 700. Despite being allied to the Dutch since the Guo Huaiyi Rebellion in 1652, the native switched sides during the siege. The aboriginals (Formosans) of Sincan defected to Koxinga after he offered them amnesty and proceeded to work for him executing captured Dutchmen. On 17 May 1661, the frontier aboriginals in the mountains and plains also surrendered and defected to the Chinese; some celebrated their freedom from compulsory education under Dutch rule by hunting down and beheading Dutch colonists and destroying their Christian school textbooks. Koxinga formulated a plan to give oxen, farming tools, and teach farming techniques to the Taiwan Aboriginals. He distributed Ming gowns and caps, hosted chieftains at feasts, and gifted tobacco to the crowds of Aboriginals who gathered to meet and welcome him as he toured native villages following his victory over the Dutch.

== Aftermath ==
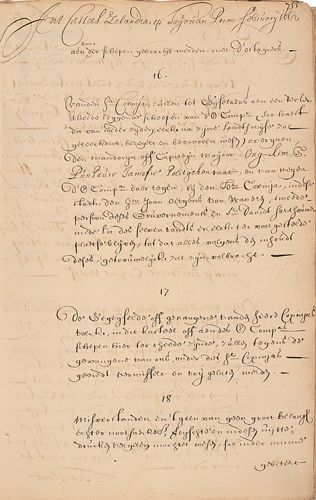
Peace Treaty of 1662, between Dutch Governor and Koxinga.

=== Dutch prisoners ===
During the siege of Fort Zeelandia, the Chinese took many Dutch prisoners, among them the missionary Antonius Hambroek, his wife, their son and daughter. Koxinga sent Hambroek to Fort Zeelandia to persuade the garrison to surrender; if unsuccessful, Hambroek would be killed upon return. Hambroek went up to the Fort, where two of his other daughters still remained, and urged the garrison not to surrender. He subsequently returned to Koxinga's camp and was beheaded. Additionally, a rumor was spread among the Chinese that the Dutch were encouraging the native Taiwan aboriginals to kill the Chinese. In retaliation, Koxinga ordered the mass execution of Dutch male prisoners, mostly by crucifixion and decapitation with a few women and children also being killed. The remainder of the Dutch women and children were enslaved, with Koxinga taking Hambroek's teenage daughter as his concubine (she was described by the Dutch commander Caeuw as "a very sweet and pleasing maiden"), while other Dutch women were sold to Chinese soldiers to become their (secondary) wives or mistresses. The daily journal of the Dutch fort recorded that "the best were preserved for the use of the commanders, and the rest were sold to the common soldiers. Happy was she that fell to the lot of an unmarried man, being thereby freed from vexations by the Chinese women, who are very jealous of their husbands." The Dutch women enslaved as concubines and wives following the siege were never freed. In 1682, at least some were reported to still be alive when a Dutch merchant based in Quemoy, received an invitation from one of Koxinga's son to arrange terms for releasing the remaining prisoners, though it came to nothing.

=== Later Ming–Dutch encounters ===
In 1663, the Dutch allied with the Qing dynasty against the Zheng forces. In 1663, 15 Dutch ships scattered a Zheng fleet of several hundred junks.

The Dutch looted relics and killed monks after attacking a Buddhist complex at Putuoshan on the Zhoushan islands in 1665 during their war against Koxinga's son Zheng Jing.

In 1666, Chinese forces made an attempt to conquer another Dutch fort in Taiwan, defended by 300 Dutch soldiers with a force of 3,000 Chinese troops. The fort had been built to ensure Dutch influence on the island after Zeelandia's fall. It was equipped with four large bastions overlooking a flat field but lacked supplies and ammunition. The garrison itself was sickly and poorly equipped. The Chinese tried to take a redoubt on a small mountain near the fortress but were repelled by a small contingent of Dutch soldiers. They then built a small fort on a foothill below the mountain and set up four cannons to shoot at the Dutch fortress. After 109 shots, one Dutchman had been killed, but nearly all the shots missed and did no damage to the walls. Nine days after arriving, the Chinese forces left. The garrison's commander, Joan de Meijer, was surprised, as he felt that any reasonably experienced commander should've been able to capture the fort. The Ming leader was, in fact, an experienced commander, but like other contemporary Chinese officers, he was unfamiliar with European-style forts, which also confounded Koxinga at Zeelandia.

Keelung was a lucrative possession for the Dutch East India Company, with 26% of the company's profits coming from their Taiwan operations in 1664. The Dutch held out at Keelung until 1668, when aborigine resistance (likely incited by Zheng Jing), and the lack of progress in retaking any other parts of the island persuaded the colonial authorities to abandon this final stronghold and withdraw from Taiwan altogether.

Koxinga's son Zheng Jing sent a Chinese commander named Piauwja by the Dutch (Xian Biao 先彪 or Biaoye 彪爷 in Chinese) with hundreds of troops to Cambodia in February 1667 to the court of Cambodian King Paramaraja VIII. Piauwja received the title of Shahbandar of the Chinese community of Cambodia from the King. Piauwja massacred 1,000 Vietnamese men, women and children in Cambodia on behalf of the Cambodian king, who wanted to break free of Vietnamese influence. Piauwja also demanded that the Dutch pay him compensation for confiscating his ships in a naval blockade. Pieter Ketting, the Dutch East India Company's representative in Cambodia only offered to pay 1,000 taels to Piauwja when an advisor to the Cambodian King said he should pay 2,000 taels. Piauwja in response then demanded Ketting pay 6,000 taels, as compensation for a debt that another Chinese merchant working for the Dutch in Batavia owed him. Ketting refused and tried to bribe Cambodian officials to help him, but Piauwja forced Ketting to pay 4,837 taels by seizing Dutch hostages. The Schelvis, another Dutch ship arrived at Cambodian capital's shoreline on the river's mouth, but the river banks low water level rendered the range of the Dutch cannons on the ship useless. The Cambodians forbade fighting between Koxinga's forces and the Dutch on Cambodian waters, so Piaujwa instead attacked the Dutch East India company outpost on land on July 9-10, fatally wounding a Dutch surgeon and killing Ketting immediately along with 3 servants. Jacob van Wijckersloot only survived by escaping to the jungle and hiding for days before reaching the Schelvis and documenting what happened. On 28 October, 1667, the Cambodian King sent a letter to the Dutch in Batavia apologising for the incident, and falsely claiming he executed Piauwja, and arrested three Dutch company employees who he said helped Piauwja against their fellow Dutch. He sent the three arrested Dutch back to Batavia, but Piauwja was in fact alive and was still working for Koxinga in the 1670s, raiding the Qing in Guangdong. Piauwja had also looted all the silk and silver on the Dutch ship Schelvisch before leaving. His name was also written as Pioja by the Dutch. Another account said Piauwja came with 3,000 Chinese troops at Oudong.

In 1672, the fleet of Koxinga's son, Zheng Jing, defeated the Dutch again in naval combat, executing 34 Dutch sailors and drowning eight Dutch sailors after looting, ambushing, and sinking the Dutch fluyt ship Cuylenburg in northeastern Taiwan. Twenty-one Dutch sailors escaped to Japan. The ship was heading from Nagasaki to Batavia on a trade mission.

== Cultural influences ==
The battle was depicted in the movie The Sino-Dutch War 1661 (Chinese: 鄭成功1661), which ended in Koxinga's victory over the Dutch.

== Gallery ==
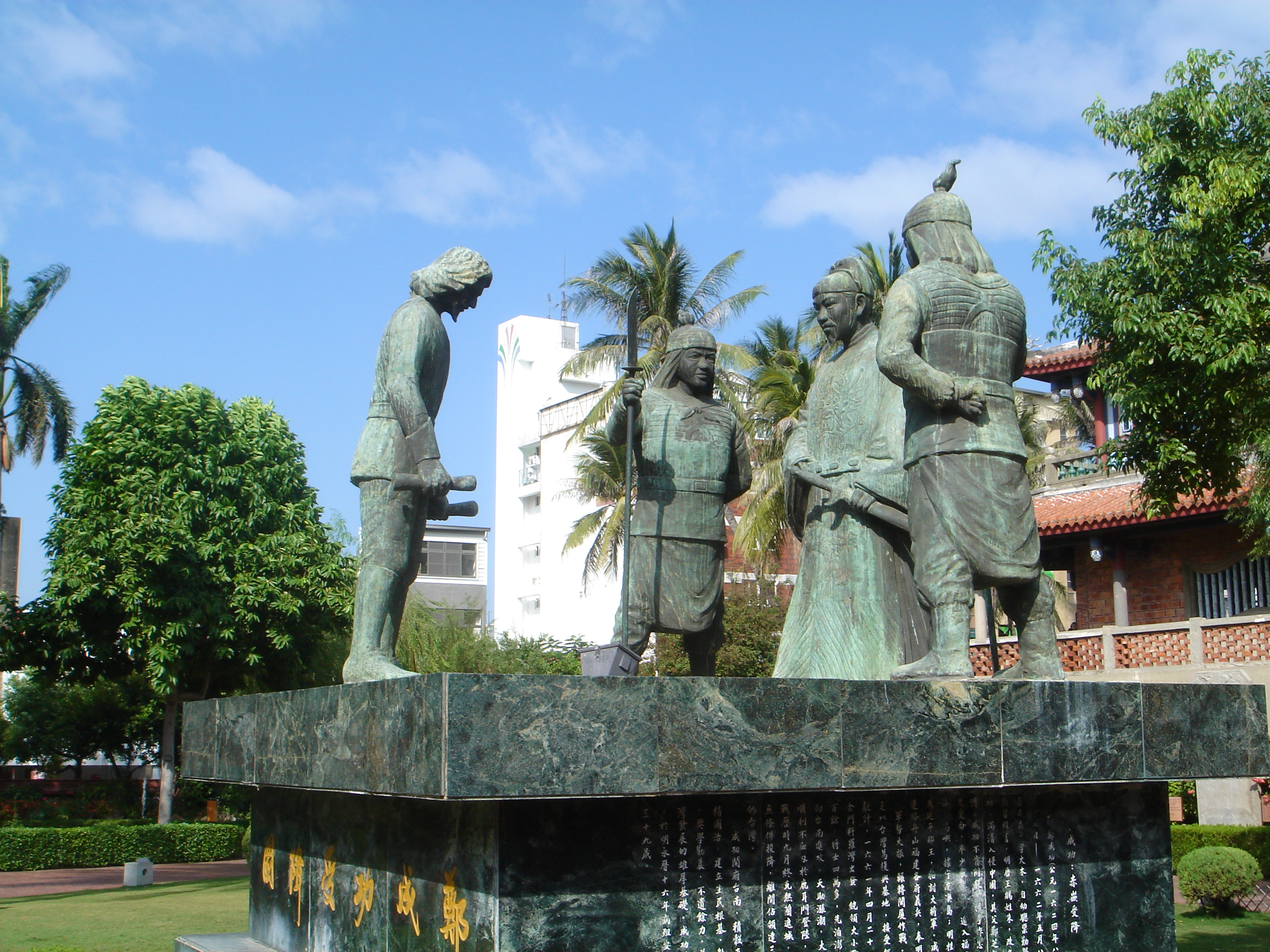
Statues of Koxinga and Dutch emissary at Chihkan Tower, the site where Fort Provintia once stood.

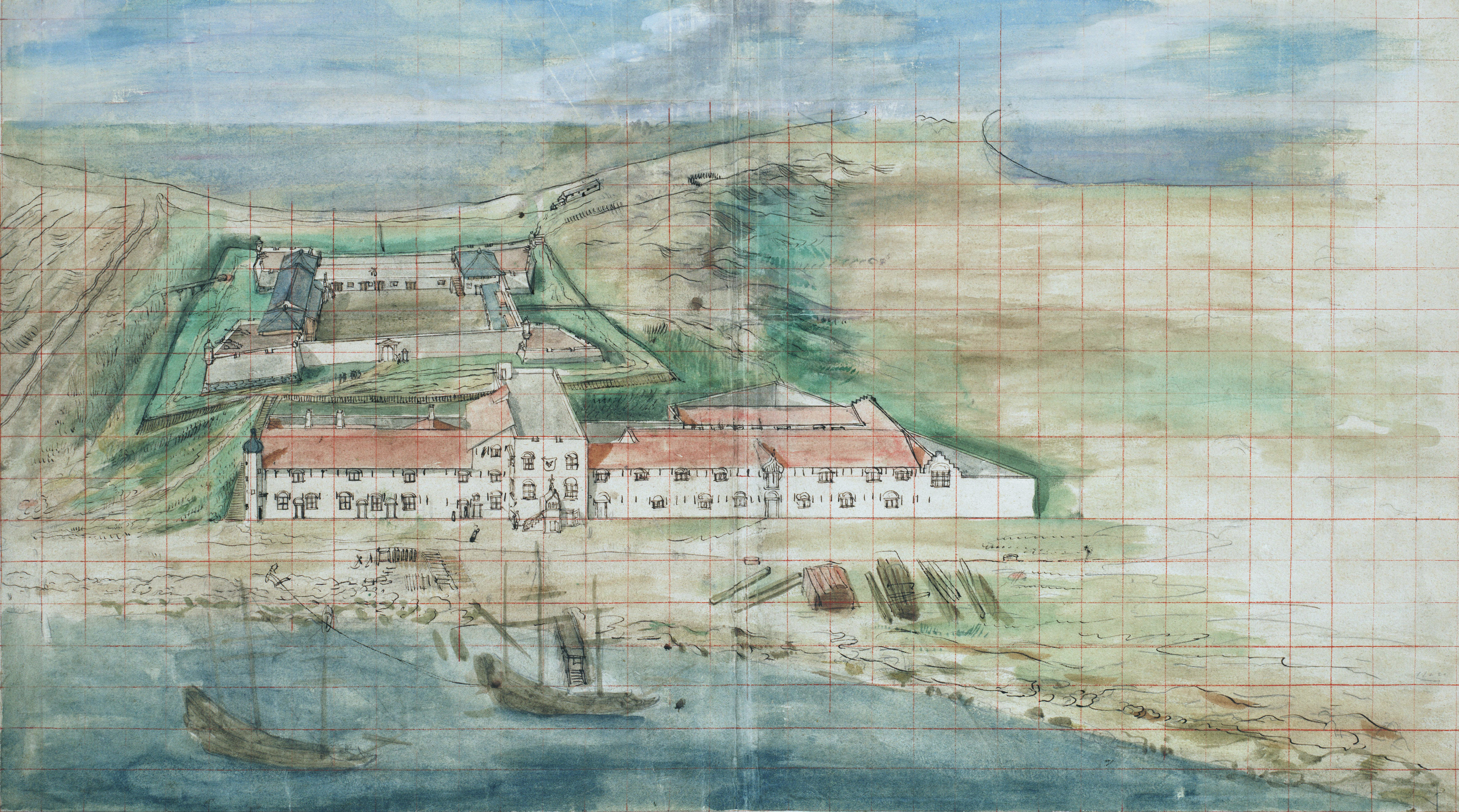
Painting of Fort Zeelandia in 1635, from The National Archives, The Hague, Netherlands

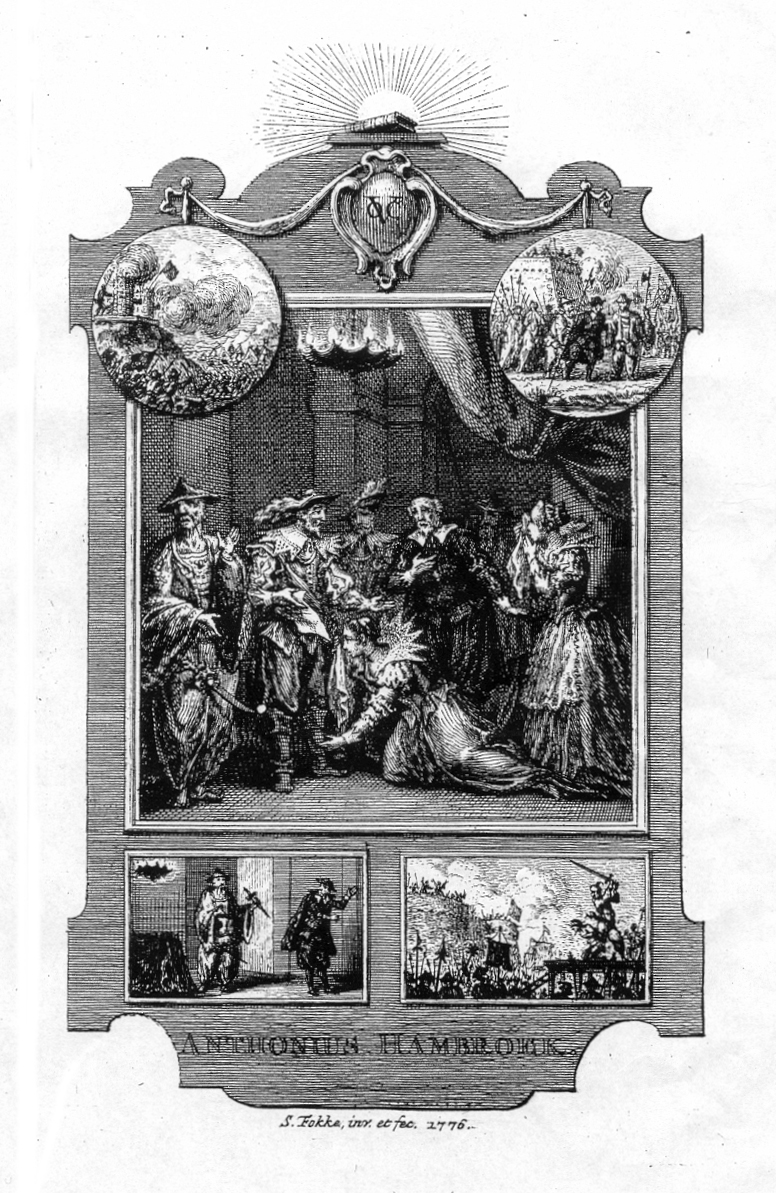
"Antonius Hambroek, of de Belegering van Formoza"

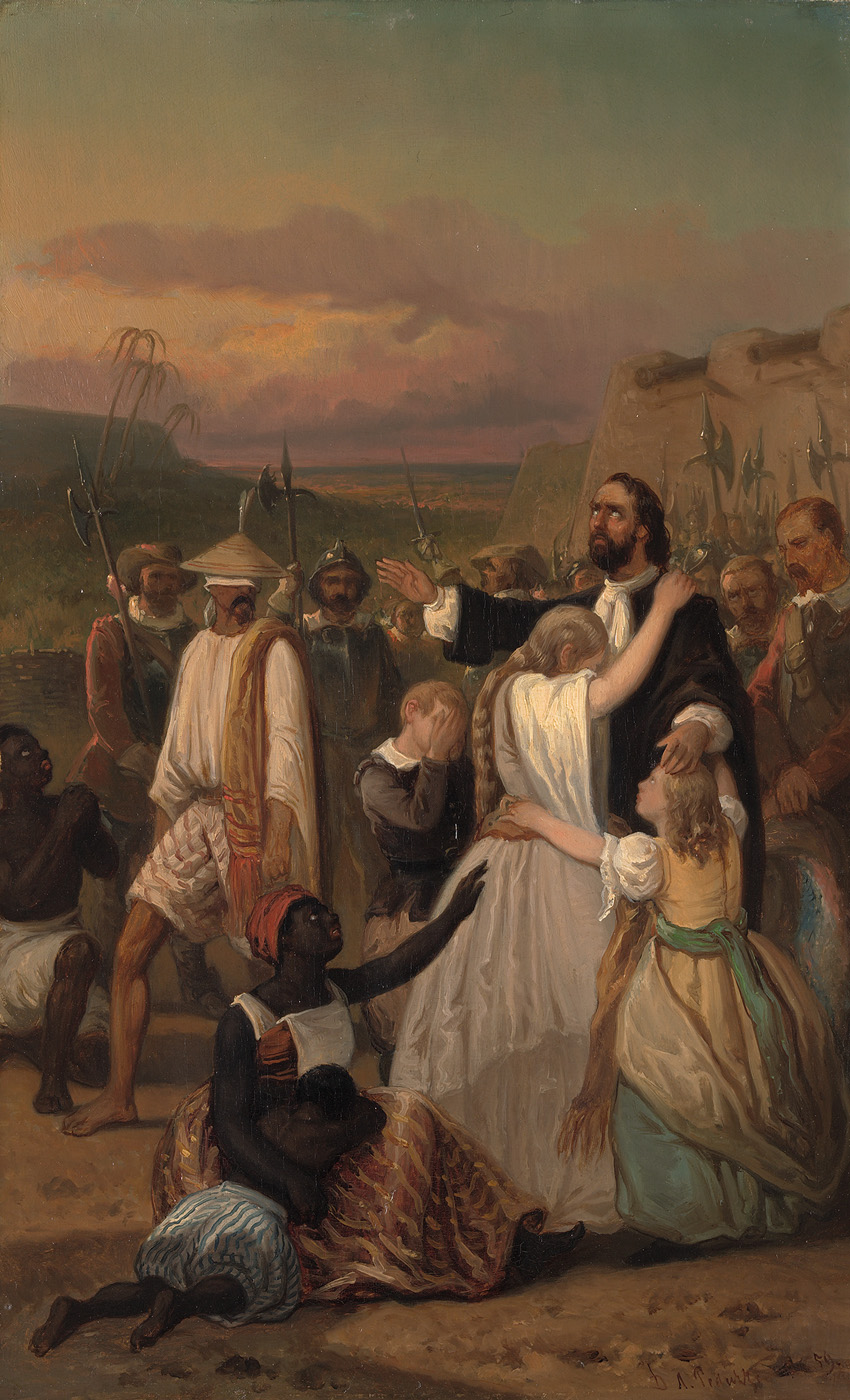
The sacrifice of Hambroek, by Dominicus Anthonius Peduzzi

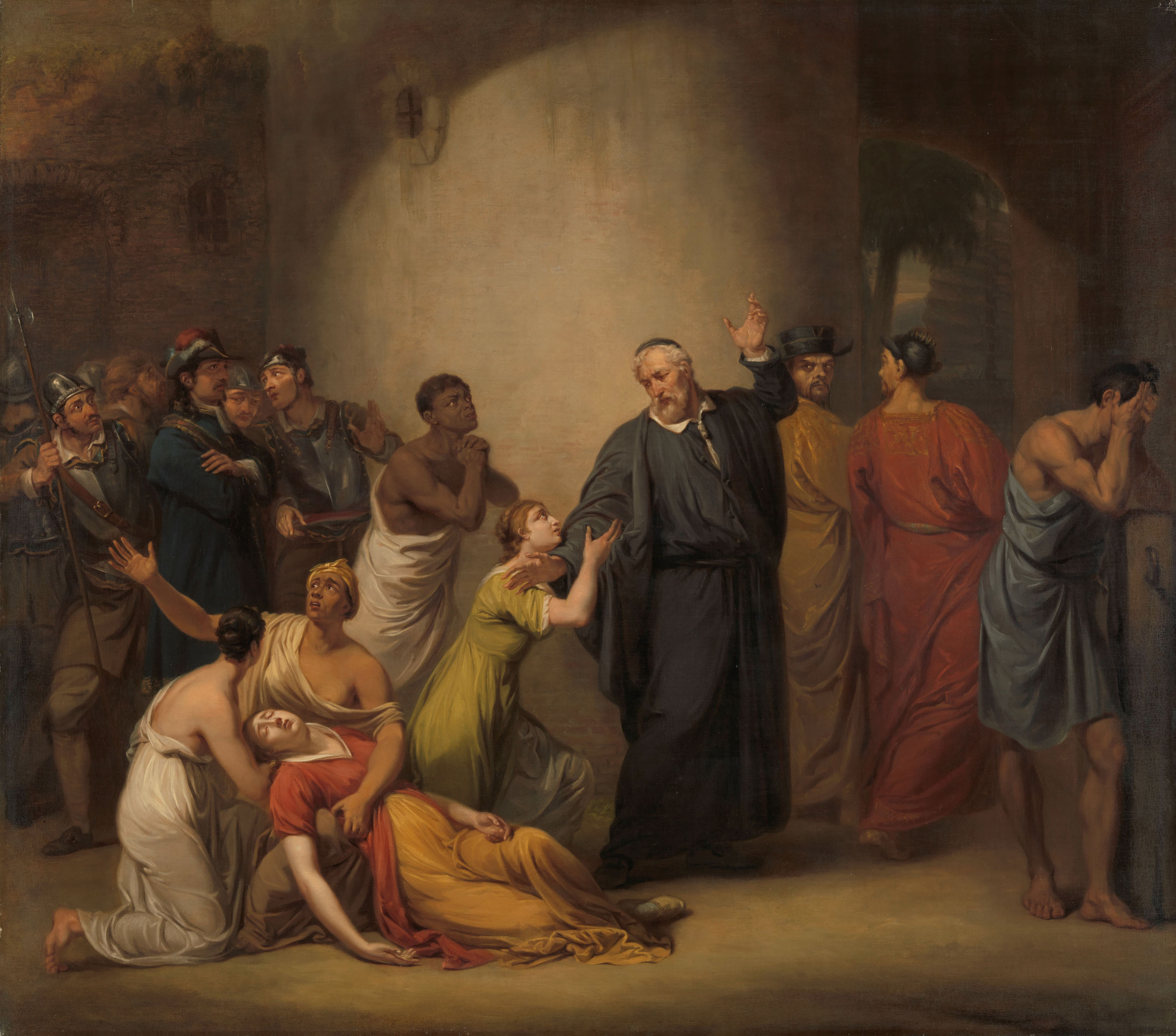
The sacrifice of Hambroek, by Jan Willem Pieneman

== See also ==
- Dutch East India Company
- Kingdom of Tungning
- Koxinga

== Bibliography ==
- Andrade, Tonio (2008). "Chapter 11: The Fall of Dutch Taiwan". How Taiwan Became Chinese: Dutch, Spanish and Han Colonization in the Seventeenth Century. New York: Columbia University Press. ISBN 9780231128551.
- Andrade, Tonio (2011a). Lost Colony: The Untold Story of China's First Great Victory Over the West (Illustrated ed.). Princeton University Press. ISBN 978-0691144559.
- Andrade, Tonio (2016). The Gunpowder Age: China, Military Innovation, and the Rise of the West in World History. Princeton University Press. ISBN 978-0-691-13597-7.
- Campbell, William (1903). Formosa Under the Dutch: Described from Contemporary Records, with Explanatory Notes and a Bibliography of the Island. London: Kegan Paul. OCLC 644323041.
- Clodfelter, M. (2017). Warfare and Armed Conflicts: A Statistical Encyclopedia of Casualty and Other Figures, 1492–2015 (4th ed.). Jefferson, North Carolina: McFarland. ISBN 978-0786474707.
- Covell, Ralph R. (1998). Pentecost of the Hills in Taiwan: The Christian Faith Among the Original Inhabitants (illustrated ed.). Hope Publishing House. ISBN 0932727905.
- Coyett, Frederick (1903) [First published 1675 in 't verwaerloosde Formosa]. "Arrival and Victory of Koxinga". In Campbell, William (ed.). Formosa under the Dutch: described from contemporary records, with explanatory notes and a bibliography of the island. London: Kegan Paul. pp. 412–459. ISBN 9789576380839. LCCN 04007338.
- Davidson, James W. (1903). "Chapter III: Formosa Under the Dutch 1644–1661". The Island of Formosa, Past and Present: History, People, Resources, and Commercial Prospects. Tea, Camphor, Sugar, Gold, Coal, Sulphur, Economical Plants, and Other Productions. London and New York: Macmillan. hdl:2027/uc2.ark:/13960/t48p69g9w. LCCN 03022967. OL 6931635M.
- Lach, Donald F.; Van Kley, Edwin J. (1998). Asia in the Making of Europe: A Century of Advance: East Asia. Chicago: University of Chicago Press. ISBN 0226467694.
- Manthorpe, Jonathan (2009). Forbidden Nation: A History of Taiwan (1st Palgrave Macmillan pbk. ed.). New York: Palgrave Macmillan. ISBN 978-0230614246.
- Struve, Lynn A., ed. (1993). Voices from the Ming–Qing Cataclysm: China in Tigers' Jaws. New Haven: Yale University Press. ISBN 0300075537.
