= Tianhou Temple (Anping) =

Coordinates: 23.0006°N 120.1607°E

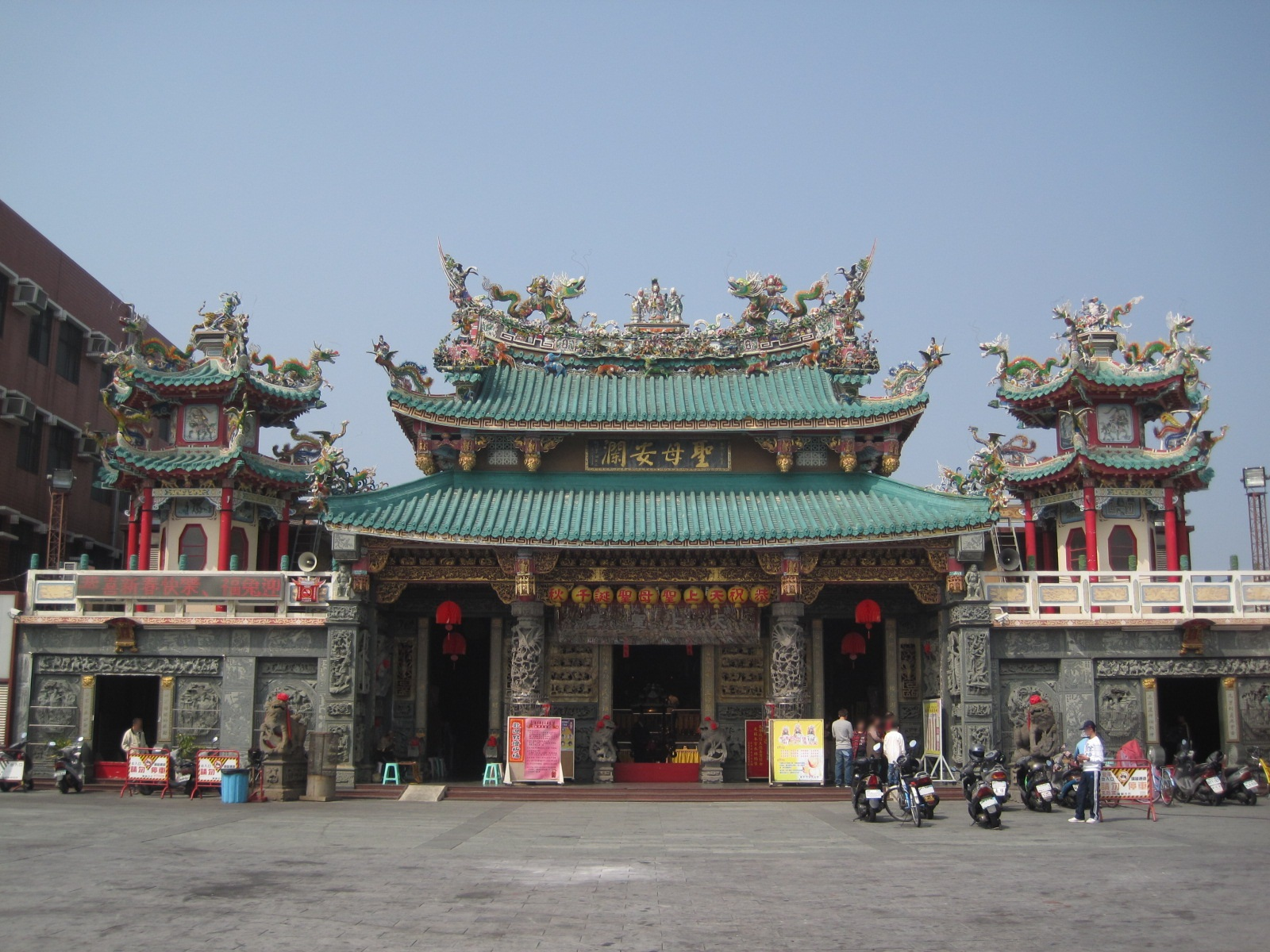
- Entrance
- Traditional Chinese: 天后宮
- Simplified Chinese: 天后宫
- Literal meaning: Heavenly Empress Palace
Transcriptions
Standard Mandarin
- Hanyu Pinyin: Tiānhòu Gōng
- Wade–Giles: Tʻien-hou Kung
Southern Min
- Hokkien POJ: Thian-hiō-kiong / Thian-hō͘-kiong

Kaitai Tianhou Temple
- Traditional Chinese: 開臺天后宮
- Simplified Chinese: 开台天后宫
Transcriptions
Standard Mandarin
- Hanyu Pinyin: Kāitái Tiānhòu Gōng
- Wade–Giles: Kʻai-tʻai Tʻien-hou Kung

The Tianhou Temple, also known as the Kaitai Tianhou or Mazu Temple, is a temple to the Chinese Goddess Mazu, who is the Goddess of Sea and Patron Deity of fishermen, sailors and any occupations related to the sea. The temple is located in the Anping District of Tainan on Taiwan.

It is open to the public from 4:30 am to 10 pm 7 days a week.

== History ==
The temple was erected at the Anping Ferry in 1668, on the site that is now occupied by Anping District's Shih-Men Primary School. Erected soon after Koxinga's successful invasion of Dutch Taiwan in the name of the Southern Ming resistance to the Qing Empire, it is thought to be the oldest extant Mazu temple on Taiwan Island. It housed statues of the Deities brought by Koxinga from Meizhou off the Fujian coast, the site of Mazuism's chief temple. The chief idol of Mazu is soft-bodied, with jointed feet, hands, and fingers and bound feet. It holds a fan in its right hand and a handkerchief in its left. It has tablets from the Guangxu Emperor of the Qing (c. 1880) and from presidents Li Denghui and Chen Shuibian of the Republic of China. It was demolished by the Japanese and has been rebuilt several times, most recently in 1976 and 1994.

== Legends ==
The primary statue is said to be more than a thousand years old. It is sometimes said to have been one of three personally brought to Taiwan by Koxinga, although the temple itself claims that a "Cheng Cheng-kung" brought it to Taiwan years earlier in 1661. Mazu is credited with various miracles around the temple, including appearing to lead Anping's initial settlers, protecting it from bombing during World War II, producing miraculous sweat, and protecting her statue during the temple's 1990 fire disaster.

== Gallery ==
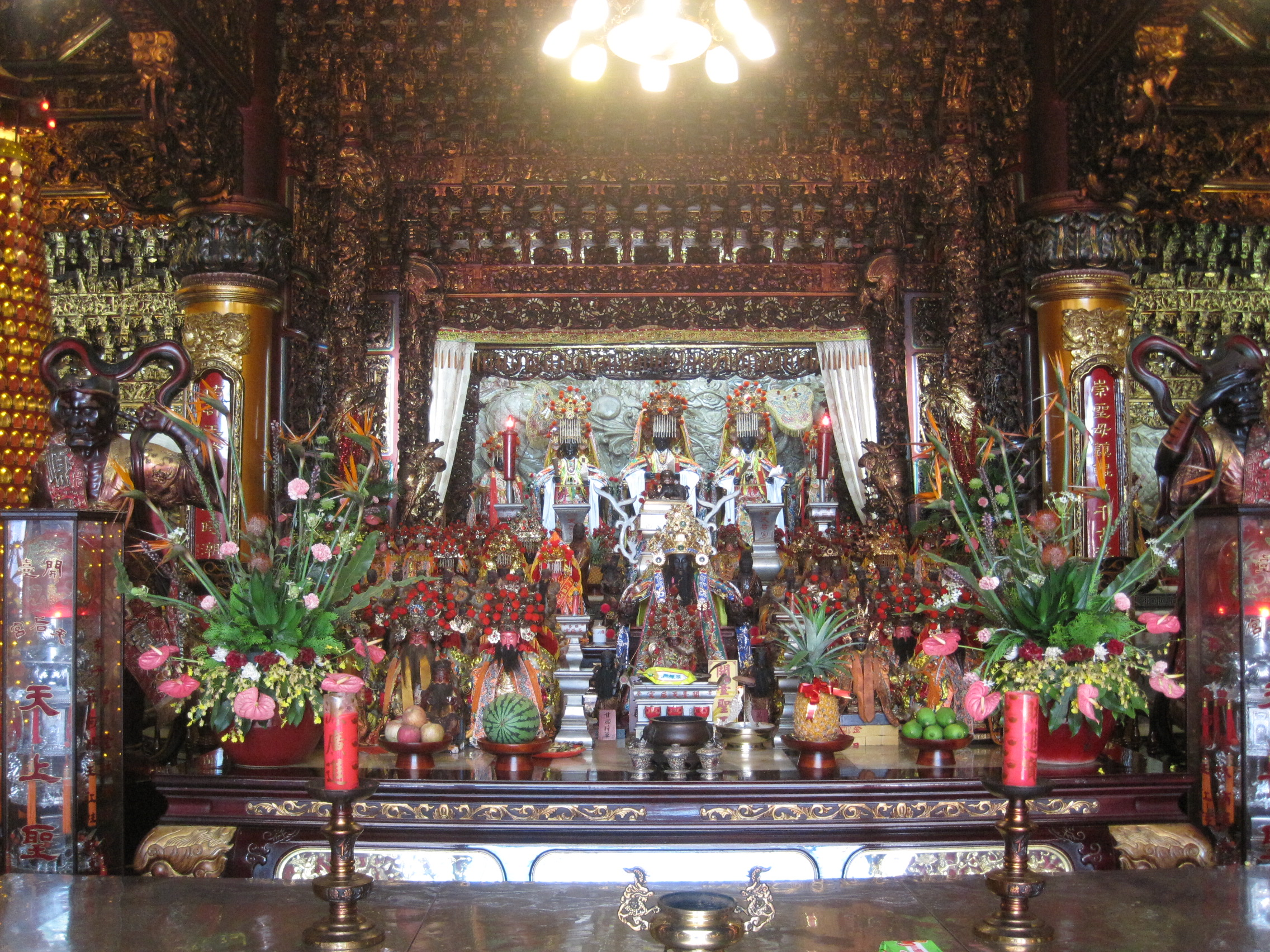
The main altar

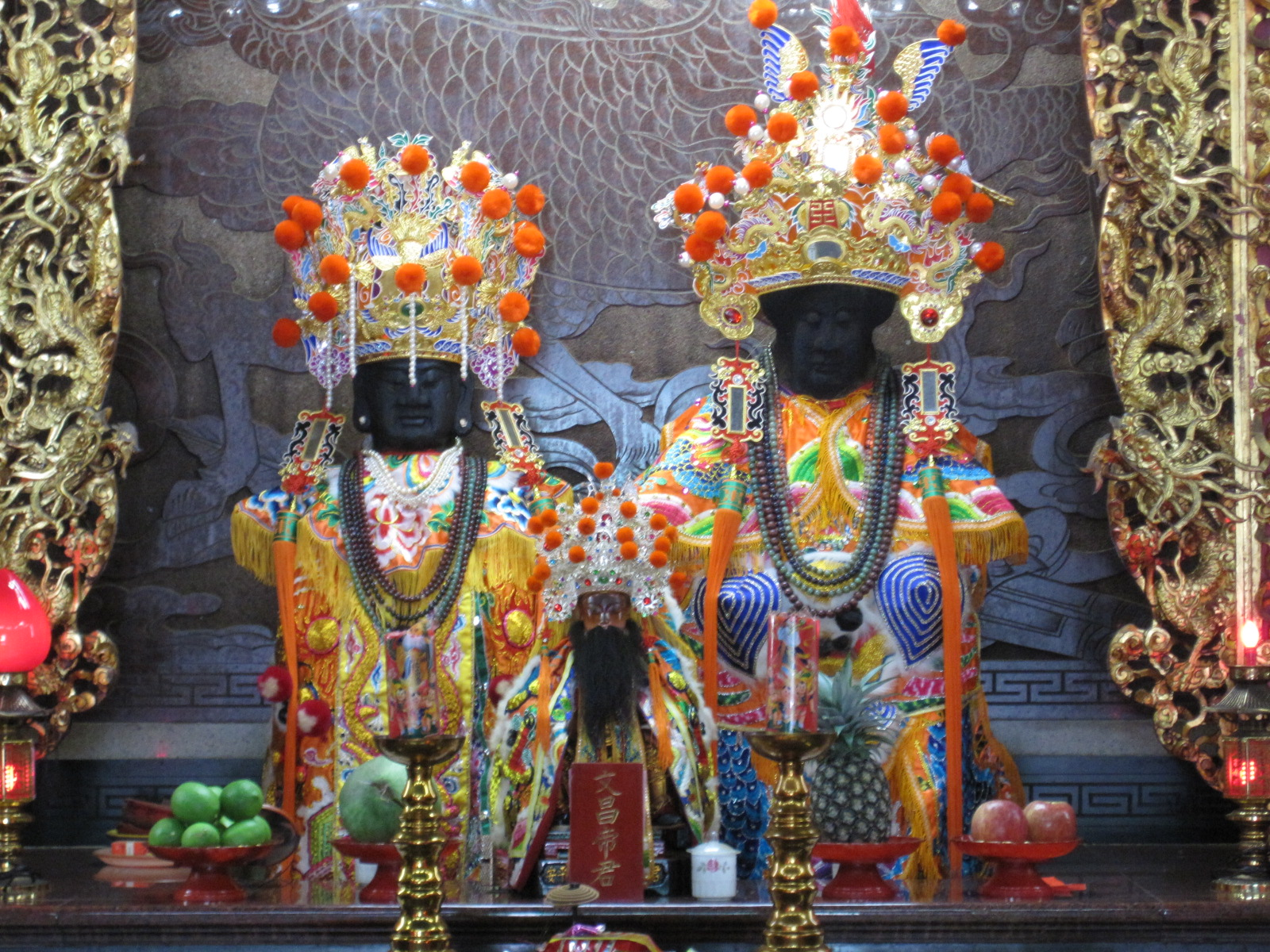
The Stone Generals

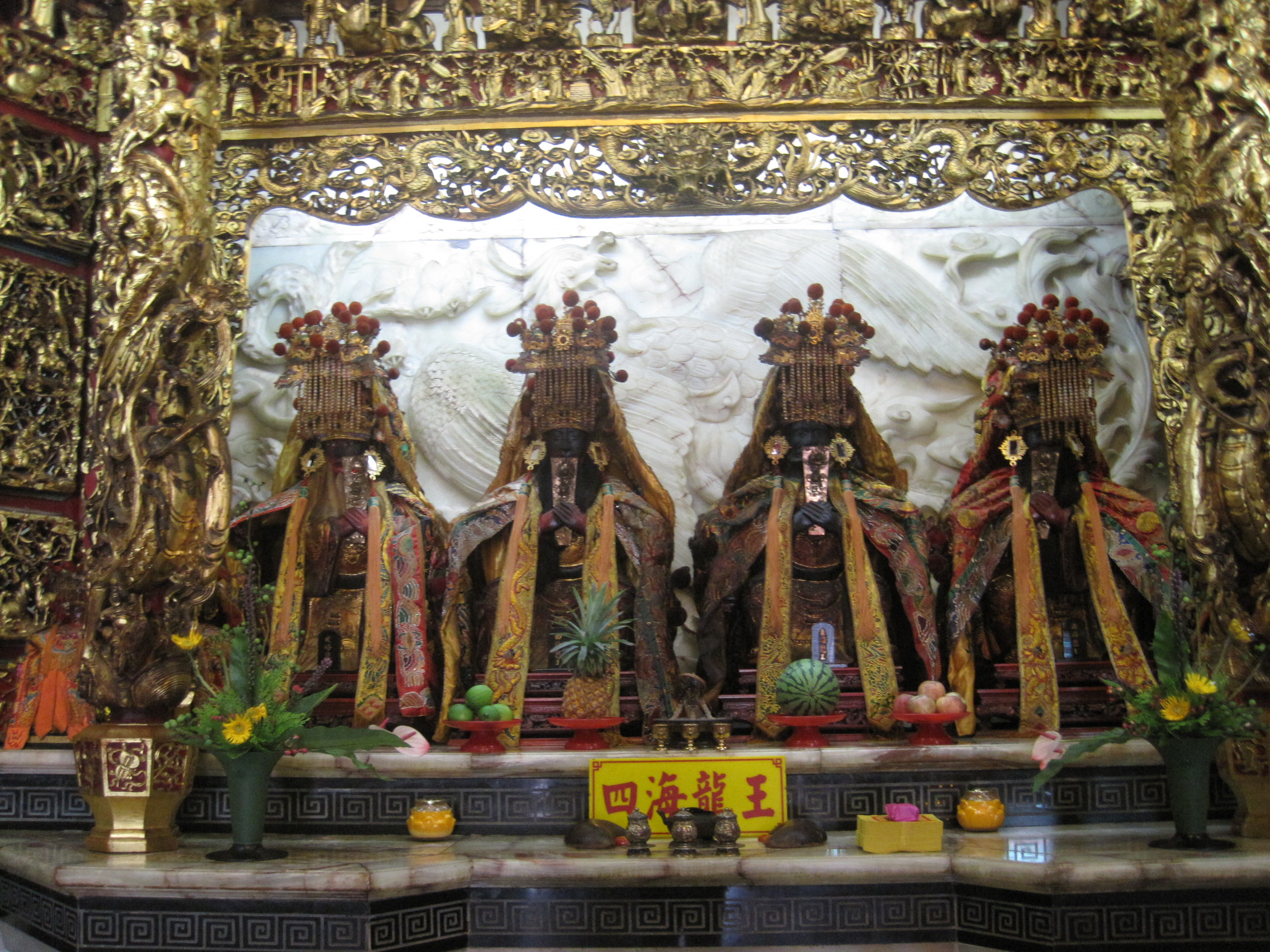
The Dragon Kings of the Four Seas

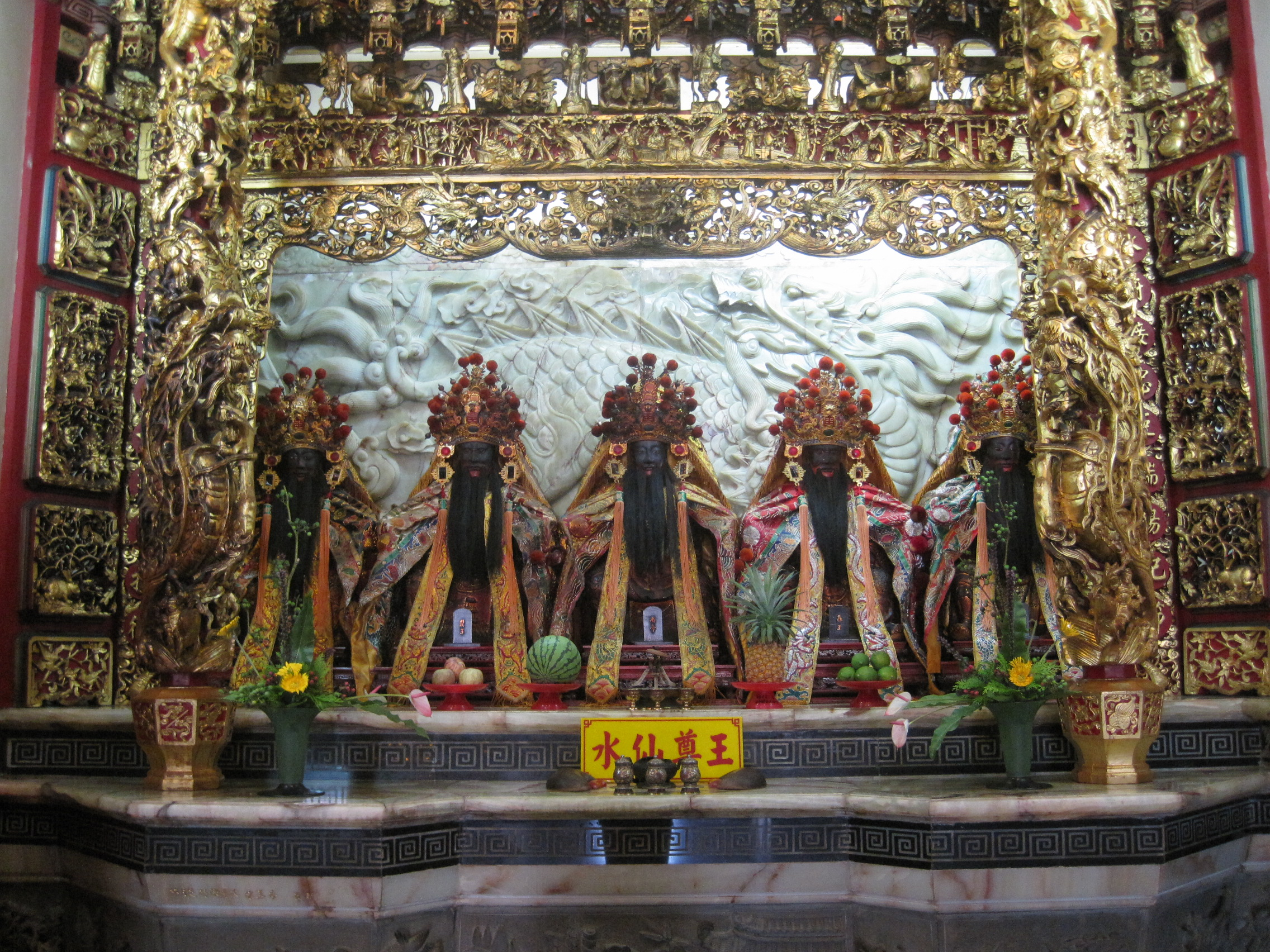
The Five Kings of the Water Immortals
