= Mount Zeehan =

Mountain in Tasmania, Australia

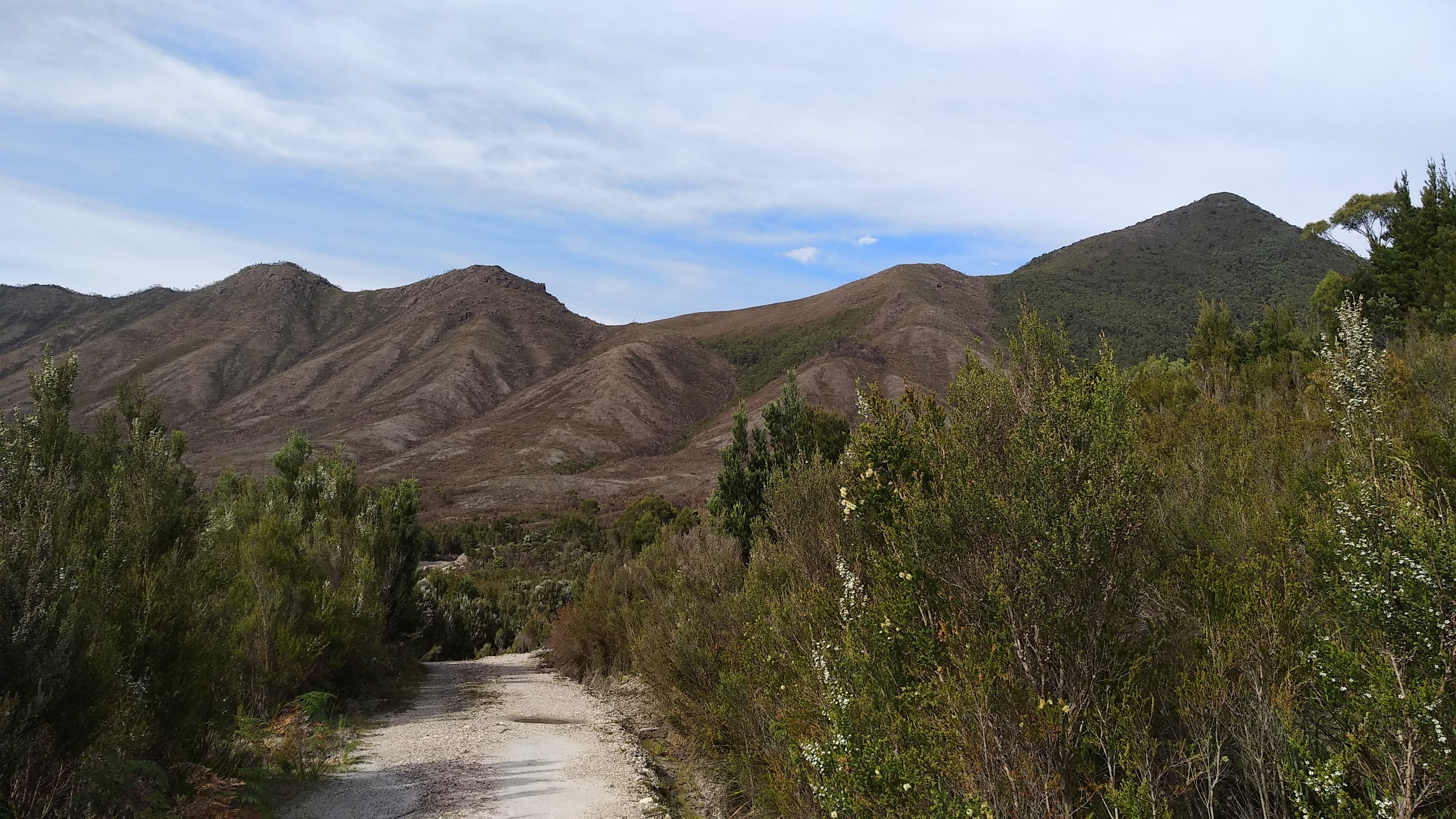
- Mt Zeehan and "The Pyramids" c. 2020

Highest point
- Elevation: 701 m (2,300 ft)
- Prominence: 441 m (1,447 ft)
- Isolation: 8.5 km (5.3 mi)
- Coordinates: 41°55′36.12″S 145°19′22.44″E

Naming
- Native name: Weiawenena Peerapper (Northwestern Tasmanian)

Geography
- Location within Tasmania
- Location: West Coast of Tasmania, Australia
- Parent range: Heemskirk Range

Geology
- Rock age: Jurassic
- Mountain type: Dolerite

Mount Zeehan (/maʊntˈziːən/ MOWNT-ZEE-ən) (Peerapper/palawa kani: Weiawenena) is a mountain located in the Heemskirk Range on the West Coast of Tasmania, Australia. It has an elevation of 701 metres (2,300 ft) above sea level. The closest town is Zeehan, about 4.93 kilometres (3 mi) to the east.

== Geography ==
Mount Zeehan is part of the Heemskirk Range, which lies west of the West Coast Range. The area is characterised by rugged terrain and dense temperate rainforest, typical of Tasmania's west coast.

== Geology ==
Mount Zeehan is primarily composed of Jurassic dolerite, a type of igneous rock widespread across Tasmania. The dolerite formations resulted from extensive volcanic activity during the breakup of the supercontinent Gondwana around 180 million years ago. The region is also known for significant deposits of silver and lead ores, contributing to a mining boom in the late 19th and early 20th centuries.

== History ==
The area surrounding Mount Zeehan has been traditionally inhabited by the Peerapper people for thousands of years. The mountain holds cultural significance, featuring in local Dreamtime stories and serving as a source of bush foods and materials.

=== European exploration and naming ===
On 24 November 1642, Dutch explorer Abel Tasman became the first European to sight and document the Heemskirk and West Coast Ranges. Tasman sailed his ships close to the coastal area, which today encompasses the Southwest Conservation Area, but was unable to land due to poor weather. In their circumnavigation of Tasmania between 1798 and 1799, George Bass and Matthew Flinders named the Heemskirk Range mountains Mount Heemskirk and Mount Zeehan after Tasman's ships, the Heemskerck and the fluyt Zeehaen ("Sea Hen") in honor of Tasman's voyage.

Although Dutch in origin, Bass and Flinders' Anglicised naming of Mount Heemskirk and Mount Zeehan created some of the oldest British place names in Tasmania. (Note: Only a few Dutch place names in Tasmania originate from Tasman's 1642 voyage. Although some place names originate from Bruni d'Entrecasteaux's French expedition in 1792, most were assigned after the settlement of Hobart Town in 1803.)

=== Mining ===
Silver-lead deposits were discovered at Mount Zeehan by Frank Long in 1882. This led to a mining boom, with Zeehan rapidly developing into one of Tasmania's largest mining towns by the early 1900s. The Zeehan mineral field contains more than 100 legacy mine sites, many affected by acid mine drainage, costing an estimated A$100,000 per hectare to remediate.

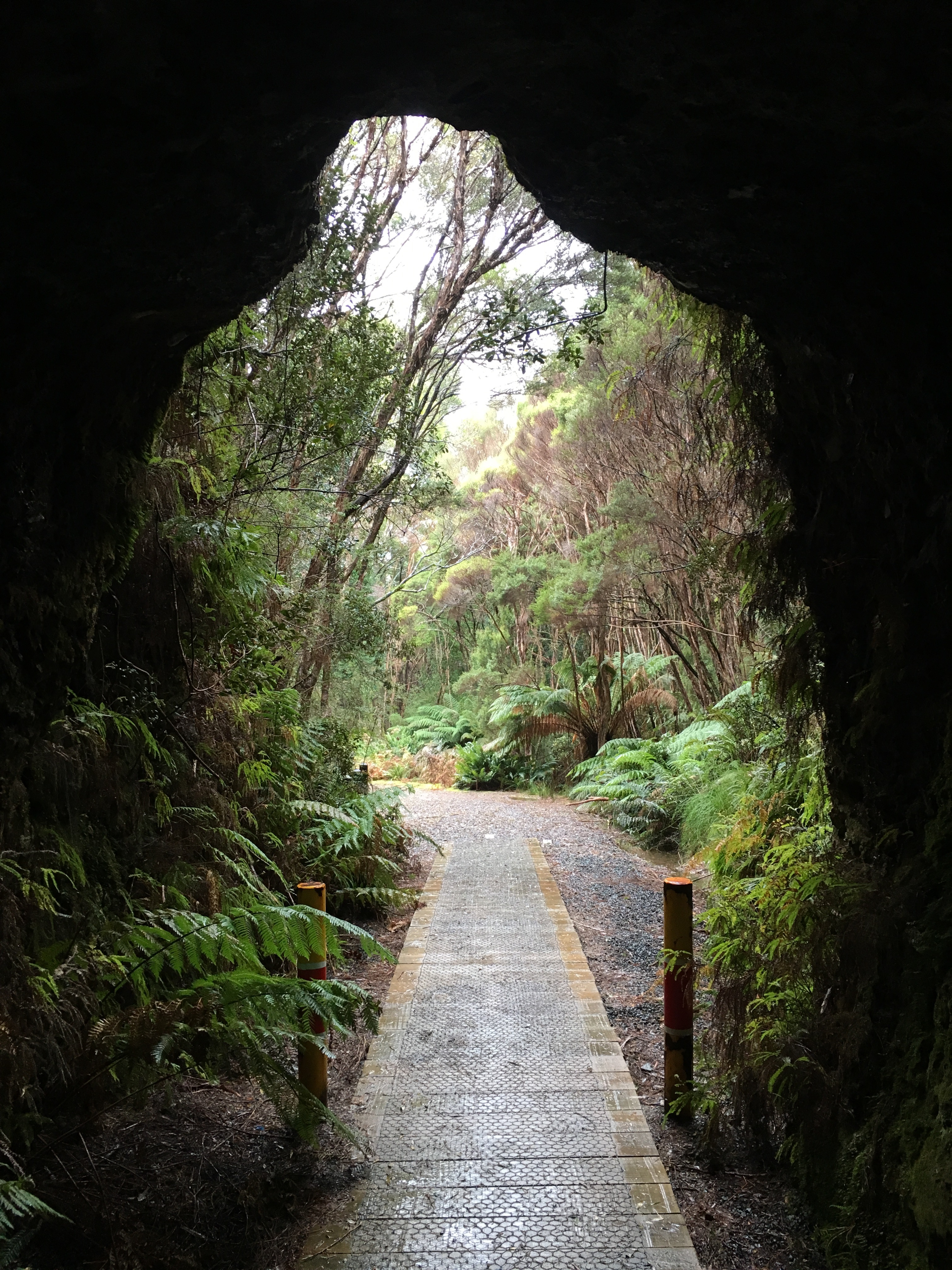
Spray Tunnel c. 2016

=== Township of Zeehan ===
Mount Zeehan Post Office opened on 1 August 1888. The township was officially named Zeehan in 1890. Zeehan became known as the "Silver City" due to the abundance of silver mined in the area.

== Tourism ==
Constructed as part of silver-mining operations in 1904, a 100-metre-long railway tunnel leading to the former Spray Silver Mine has become a popular walking destination for tourists. The Spray Tunnel was closed in January 2022 after cracks were discovered in the ceiling but has since been reopened after safety assessments and repairs.

A three-hour return walk to the summit of Mount Zeehan is accessible via a four-wheel drive track. The track offers panoramic views of the surrounding landscapes, including the town of Zeehan and nearby ranges. The area attracts hikers and history enthusiasts interested in the region's natural beauty and mining heritage.

== Access ==
Mount Zeehan is accessible primarily by road, with the closest town being Zeehan, approximately 4.93 kilometres (3.06 mi) away. The main route to Zeehan is via the Murchison Highway (A10), which connects Zeehan to other major towns on Tasmania's West Coast, including Rosebery to the north and Queenstown to the south. The road is sealed, making it accessible by most vehicles.

A number of unsealed tracks provide access closer to the mountain itself, including four-wheel drive tracks used by hikers to reach the summit. These tracks are not suitable for standard vehicles and are recommended for experienced off-road drivers or hikers.

Historically, the region was serviced by rail during the mining boom of the late 19th and early 20th centuries. The North East Dundas Tramway operated between Mount Zeehan and Deep Lead (now Williamsford), providing critical infrastructure for the transport of silver-lead ore. Opening in 1896 and closing in 1932, it was part of the Tasmanian Government Railways network. The world's first Garratt locomotives, the K class, were used on the line.
