= Gaiety Theatre, Zeehan =

Historic theatre in Zeehan, Tasmania, Australia

Gaiety Theatre
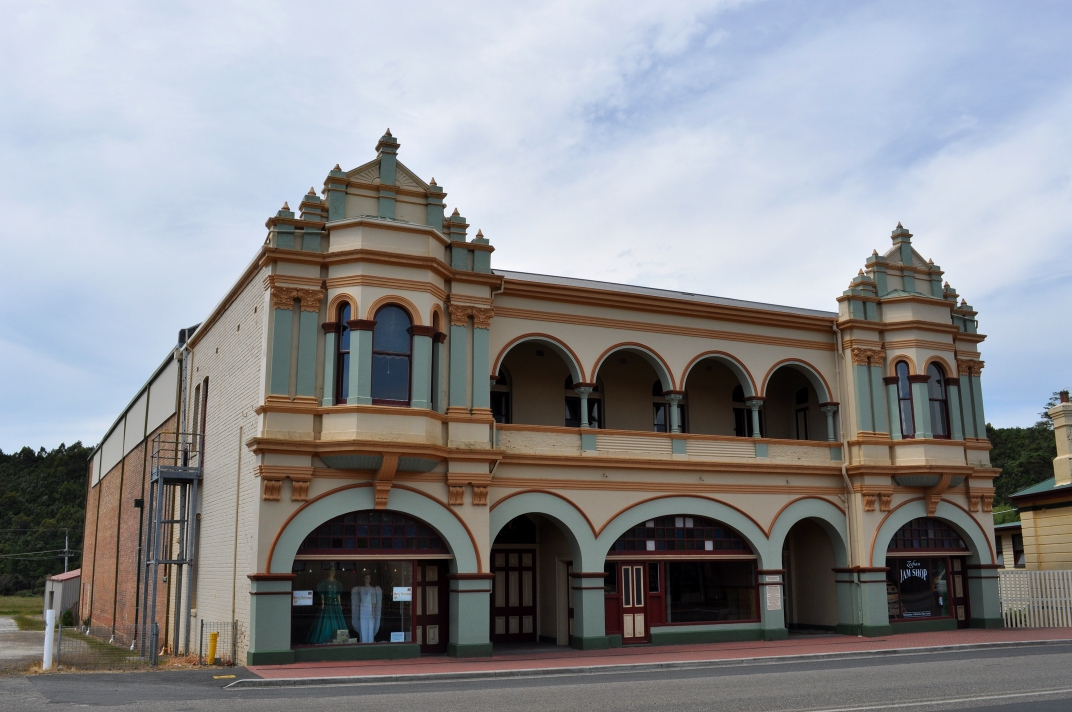
- The Gaiety Theatre and Grand Hotel in 2012
- Interactive map of Gaiety Theatre
- Address: 120 Main Street; Zeehan, Tasmania; Australia
- Coordinates: 41°52′55.25″S 145°20′6.99″E
- Owner: West Coast Council
- Capacity: 1,000 (1898); 500 (2006)
- Designation: Tasmanian Heritage Register
- Current use: cinema, live entertainment

Construction
- Opened: 9 October 1898; 128 years ago
- Years active: 1898-1968, 2006-present
- Architect: Mr. T. Searell

Website
- Official site

Tasmanian Heritage Register
- Place ID: 5,659
- Status: Permanently Registered

The Gaiety Theatre and Grand Hotel is a historic theatre and hotel in Zeehan, Tasmania, Australia.

== History ==
Draper and hotelier Edward Mulcahy M.H.A built a timber hotel called the Royal Exchange on the site of an abandoned silver and lead mine in 1882. Although it was destroyed by fire in 1884, Mulcahy assembled his own and other capital to enter into a new enterprise for the Gaiety Theatre and Grand Hotel on the same site. The destruction of the Royal Exchange and his personal loss of £5,000 was strong in Mulcahy's mind, so the new building was constructed of brick, the first of which were being made at that time in Zeehan by resident John Connor. Completed in 1898, the Gaiety Theatre and Grand Hotel cost a staggering £7,075. The building is an example of a hotel coupled with a theatre.

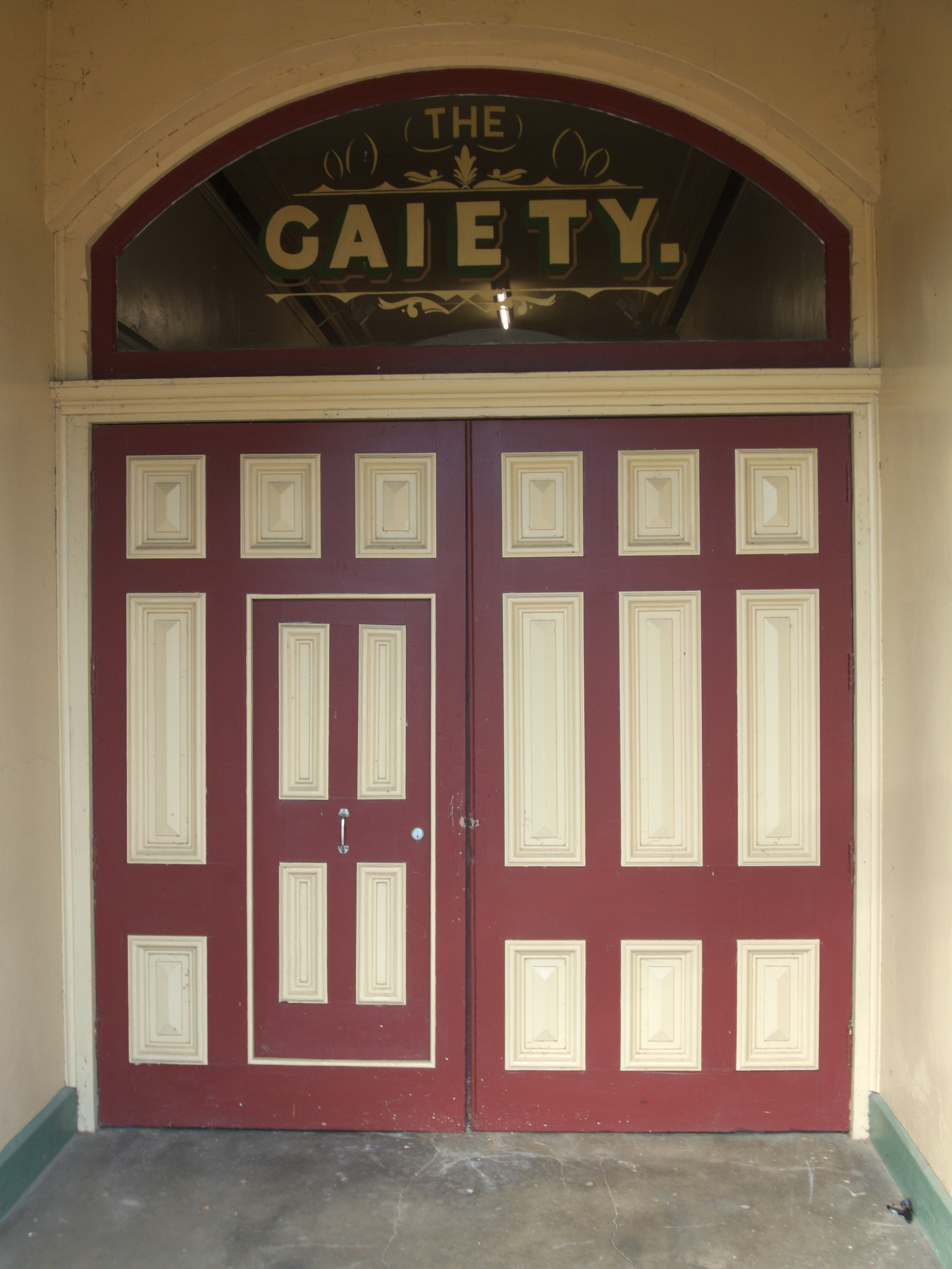
Entrance to the Gaiety Theatre in 2017

=== Gaiety Theatre ===
The theatre had a seating capacity for over 1,000 patrons with a large stage measuring 15 by 12 metres (48 ft × 38 ft). The Gaiety was used for regular touring company performances by J. C. Williamson Ltd, as well as live music, bioscopes, films, and sporting events such as wrestling and gymnastics. In 1899, American actor Grattan Riggs collapsed after a performance at the Gaiety and later died at the Strahan Hospital. Film director, producer, and exhibitor F. W. Thring honed his skills as an elocutionist and actor at the Gaiety. Thring would go on to start Biograph Pictures Co in Tasmania in 1911, before founding Efftee Studios in Melbourne in 1931. Merchant Edmund John Miller ( – 7 August 1930), who made his fortune on the Zeehan mineral field, witnessed the rising popularity of the first silent films in vaudeville programming at the Gaiety Theatre and nearby Theatre Royal, which would later influence him to build The Strand in Hobart. The Story of the Kelly Gang, the world's first feature-length film, screened during its initial run at the Gaiety in May, 1907. In 1910, Corrick Family Entertainers premiered Leonard Corrick's Leonard’s Beautiful Pictures at the Gaiety as part of their travelling program. A newly digitised version by the National Film and Sound Archive was projected at the Gaiety as part of the Ten Days on the Island festival in 2021.

The theatre lays to many contentious claims, such as being Australia's largest concert hall at time of construction, as well as whether-or-not tenor Enrico Caruso, Nellie Melba or Houdini performed at the theatre.

=== Grand Hotel ===
The Grand Hotel commanded city hotel rates (ten shillings per day) and offered modern luxuries. The hotel safe was robbed in 1910. The economic downturn in Zeehan following the First World War left many businesses in decline and buildings left to decay. In 1935, the Grand Hotel was able to resume trading after "improvements demanded by the police" were deemed satisfactory.

=== Decline and restoration ===
Throughout the 40s and 50s, the theatre hosted dancing lessons and community meetings. In the 1980s, the hotel fell into disuse and the theatre was used for basketball games. In 2000, Carlene Vickers from "Friends of the Gaiety" became a Local Hero finalist in the Tasmanian Australian of the Year Awards when the society managed to raise $120,000 for restoration works. The original theatre seats, dating back to 1910, were being used by the Ulverstone Jehovah's Witness congregation. They were refitted into the Gaiety as part of the theatre's restoration. The Gaiety officially reopened in April 2006.

== Contemporary use ==
Since 2011, a reconstruction of Louise Lovely and Wilton Welch's lost film Jewelled Nights, which was shot near Zeehan, screens daily alongside The Story of the Kelly Gang and The Sign of the Cross. The reconstructed film runs for 17 minutes and consists of original footage, outtakes, production stills from nearby Savage River, as well as animations to reimagine the story. The theatre can be inspected by people who buy tickets to the West Coast Pioneers Museum Complex. The Gaiety hosted a performance of Madame Butterfly by the Melbourne City Ballet in 2018 to a crowd of 100 patrons. Since 2020, the theatre has been subject to paranormal investigations, led by tour operator Tasmania’s Most Haunted. A $3m figure was floated as a means to completely refurbish the Gaiety in 2021. In 2022, the theatre was utilised as a location for the television series Bay of Fires, starring Marta Dusseldorp.

== See also ==
List of theatres in Hobart
