= Main Street, Zeehan =

Street in Zeehan, Tasmania, Australia

Main Street Tasmania
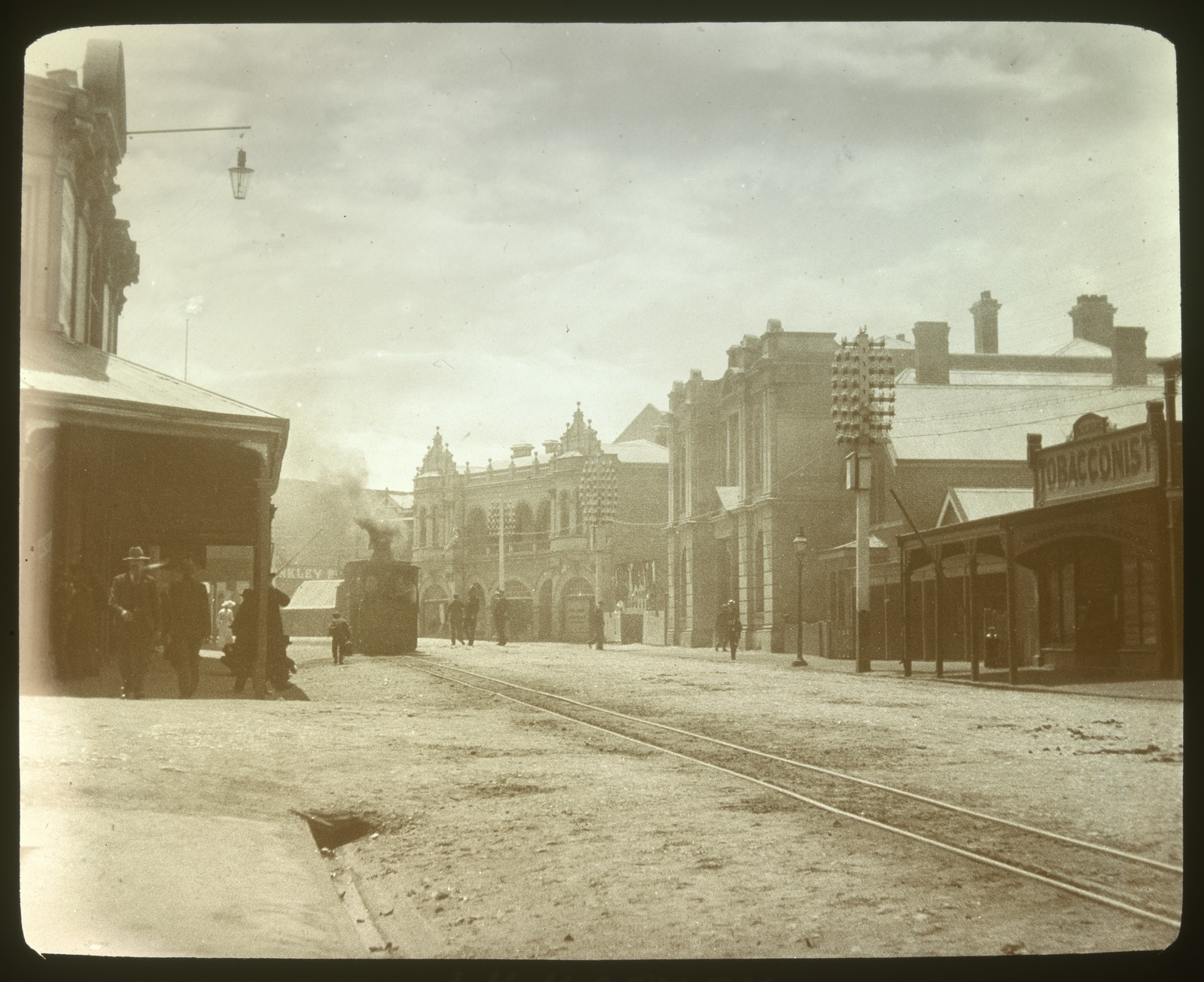
- Main Street, Zeehan, c. 1890s

General information
- Type: Street
- Location: Zeehan
- Length: 3.2 km (2.0 mi)

Major junctions
- Heemskirk Road; Henty Road; Zeehan Highway

Main Street (Tasmanian road number C248) is a 3.2-kilometre (2.0 mi) street in the town of Zeehan, on the west coast of the island state of Tasmania, Australia. The street is notable for its late 19th and early 20th century buildings associated with the mining boom of the Zeehan mineral field that shaped the development of the town.

== History ==
Zeehan developed as a centre for silver and lead mining, particularly during the late 19th and early 20th centuries. Main Street was constructed in the late 1890s and became a focal point for the town’s commercial and civic life.

A number of heritage-listed buildings remain on Main Street, including the Gaiety Theatre, the West Coast Heritage Centre (formerly the Zeehan School of Mines and Metallurgy), as well as former hotels, shops, and residences from the late 1800s and early 1900s. The street was also used by tramways serving the town.

=== Gaiety Theatre ===
The Gaiety Theatre, built in 1898, is one of the most prominent landmarks on Main Street. It was noted for its elaborate facade and hosted a range of performances and community events during the height of Zeehan’s mining prosperity.

=== Shelverton Hotel ===
The Shelverton Hotel was located near the railway station and tram terminus. Contemporary reports describe it as a substantial building containing about 40 rooms and various public and private facilities. The hotel was destroyed by fire on 29 May 1913. At the time of the fire the occupants were the licensee, P. Quinn, a housemaid, and the barman. Although nearby stables and stores were saved, the building was lost along with its furnishings. The hotel, owned by W. Rainbird, was insured for £1200, with its contents insured for £600. The cause of the fire was not determined.

During its operation the hotel accommodated Governor Viscount Gormanston and Lady Gormanston during their vice-regal visit for the opening of the North East Dundas Tramway in 1898.

=== West Coast Heritage Centre ===
The West Coast Heritage Centre occupies the site of the former Zeehan School of Mines and Metallurgy. It serves as a museum and cultural institution highlighting the history of the West Coast region of Tasmania, with a focus on mining and the development of Zeehan. The Centre incorporates several original township buildings, including:

- Zeehan School of Mines and Metallurgy
- Gaiety Theatre
- Zeehan Post Office
- Zeehan Courthouse

== See also ==
- Orr Street, Queenstown
