= Mount Heemskirk =

Mountain in Tasmania, Australia

- Location within Tasmania

Highest point
- Elevation: 751 m (2,464 ft)
- Prominence: 171 m (561 ft)
- Isolation: 4.41 km (2.74 mi)
- Coordinates: 41°51′6.66″S 145°10′19.96″E

Naming
- Native name: Roeinrim, Traoota munatta Peerapper (Northwestern Tasmanian)

Geography
- Location: West Coast of Tasmania, Australia
- Parent range: Heemskirk Range

Geology
- Rock age: Jurassic
- Mountain type: Dolerite

Mount Heemskirk is a mountain in Western Tasmania, west of the West Coast Range. It has an elevation of 751 metres (2,464 ft) above sea level. The closest town is Zeehan, about 14 kilometres (9 mi) away.

== History ==
The indigenous Peerapper name for the mountain is recorded as Roeinrim or Traoota munatta.

=== European naming ===
On 24 November 1642, Dutch explorer Abel Tasman became the first European explorer to sight and document the Heemskirk and West Coast Ranges. Tasman sailed his ships close to the coastal area which today encompasses the Southwest Conservation Area, south of Macquarie Harbour, but was unable to send a landing party ashore due to poor weather and did not make contact with any South West Tasmanian groups. In their circumnavigation of Tasmania between 1798 and 1799, George Bass and Matthew Flinders named the Heemskirk Ranges mountains Mount Heemskirk and Mount Zeehan after Tasman's ships, the warship Heemskerck (itself named after Jacob van Heemskerck, whose surname means "from Heemskerk") and the 200-tonne (200-long-ton; 220-short-ton) fluyt Zeehaen (Old Dutch for "Sea Rooster") in honour of Tasman's voyage of exploration. Although Dutch in origin, Bass and Flinder's Anglicised naming of Mount Heemskirk and Mount Zeehan created some of the oldest British place names in Tasmania. (Note: Only a few Dutch place names in Tasmania originate from Tasman's 1642 voyage. Although some place names originate from Bruni d'Entrecasteaux's French expedition in 1792, most place names were not assigned in Van Diemen's Land until after the settlement of Hobart Town at Risdon Cove in 1803. It was not until after the 1815 discovery of Macquarie Harbour by explorer and mariner James Kelly that many place names on the West Coast were assigned.)

== Mining ==
The mountain and its surrounding high ground was also known as the Heemskirk mining area in the 1890s and the first decade of the 1900s.

== Tourism ==
After the success of mountain biking in Derby, several mountain bike trails opened on Mount Heemskirk in 2020.
