= List of place names of Dutch origin in Australia =

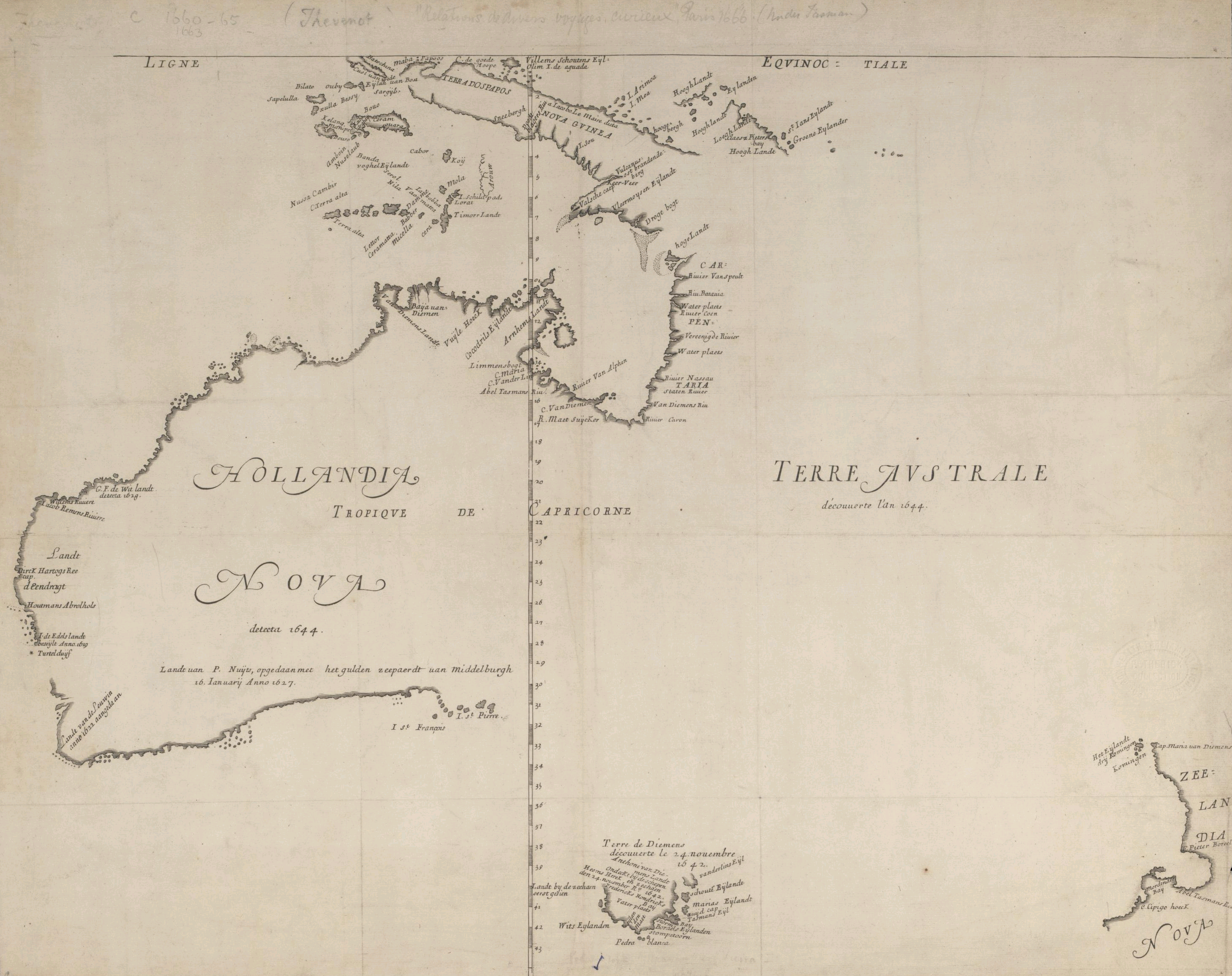
The Australian coast known to Dutch explorers until 1644. Note the whole east coast is missing.

Of an estimated 200 place names the Dutch bestowed on Australian localities in the 17th century as a result of the Dutch voyages of exploration along the western, northern and southern Australian coasts, only about 35 can still be found on current maps. Five out of six names were either renamed or forgotten or their locations were lost. Other places were named after the early Dutch explorers by later British explorers or colonists, for instance the Australian state of Tasmania is named after Abel Tasman. Australia itself was called New Holland by the English and Nieuw Holland by the Dutch.

== Places named by the Dutch ==
=== Queensland ===
The Dutch charted the western side of Cape York Peninsula and the coast of the Gulf of Carpentaria. Willem Janszoon made the first recorded European landfall in Australia during the Janszoon voyage of 1605-6.

Dutch name	English translation	Date	Reason for naming	Coords	Notes
Kaap Keerweer	Cape Keerweer	1606	Meaning 'Cape Return'in English, the point where the Duijfken turned North	13°56′00″S 141°28′30″E. See also the record of Captain John Saris, English East India Company, 15 June 1606, who met Janszoon on his return journey. It mentions the actual words "to return", while ' in English 'Ik keer weer' means 'I return' See: https://www.nma.gov.au/defining-moments/resources/janszoon-maps-northern-australian-coast. Saris written report includes: "...there were nine of them killed … so they were constrained to returne, finding no good to be done there".	
Golf van Carpentaria	Gulf of Carpentaria	1623	Pieter de Carpentier, then Governor-General of the Dutch East Indies	13°59′S 139°00′E	Situated between the Northern Territory and Queensland
Coen Rivier	Coen River	1623	Jan Pieterszoon Coen, previous Governor-General of the Dutch East Indies	13°37′S 142°08′E	Renamed to Archer River, while its southern tributary (the "South Coen River") retained its name
Staaten Rivier	Staaten River	1623	Like Staten Island after the Staten-Generaal	16°24′S 141°17′E	
Nassau Rivier	Nassau River	1644	Maurice of Nassau, Prince of Orange	15°54′S 141°23′E	
Van Diemens Baai	Van Diemen Inlet	1644	Anthony van Diemen, then Governor-General of the Dutch East Indies	16°58′S 140°59′E	
Kaap Van Diemen	Cape Van Diemen	1644	Anthony van Diemen	16°31′S 139°42′E	eastern cape of Mornington Island in the Wellesley Islands

==== Renamed ====
Dutch name	Current name	Date	Reason for naming	Coords	Notes
Riv. met het Bosch	Pennefather River	1606	For being a river in the bush	12°13′S 141°44′E	Australia's first recorded place name, possibly named after the emblematic "bush". The Dutch word bosch, current spelling bos, did at the time cover meanings from shrub via bush to forest.
Carpentaria	Cape York Peninsula	1623 ?	Pieter de Carpentier	14°S 140°E	
Van Speult Rivier	Jardine River		Dutch local governor, Herman van Speult	10°55′S 142°12′E	
Batavia Rivier	Wenlock River		Batavia	12°03′S 141°55′E	

=== Northern Territory ===
Dutch name	English translation	Date	Reason for naming	Coords	Notes
Kaap Arnhem	Cape Arnhem and Arnhem Land	1623	The ship Arnhem which explored the area.	12°21′S 136°58′E	The ship was itself named after the city of Arnhem, Gelderland.
Groote Eylandt	"Big island"	sighted 1623, named 1644		14°00′S 136°35′E	
Wesel Eilanden	Wessel Islands	1636	The ship Klein Wesel or just Wezel, which explored the area.	11°30′S 136°25′E	The ship was itself named after the city of Wesel, Duchy of Cleves.
Crocodils Eijlandt	Crocodile Islands	1644	Saltwater crocodiles	11°53′S 135°05′E	
Kaap Van der Lijn	Cape Vanderlin	1644	Cornelis van der Lijn, member of the Council of India	15°35′S 136°59′E	Actually the Sir Edward Pellew Group of Islands, the cape name is used for the northern tip of Vanderlin Island
Kaap Maria	Maria Island	1644	Maria Van Aelst, wife of Anthony van Diemen	14°52′S 135°44′E	An island, not a cape, in the Limmen Bight, now called Maria Island
Limmen Bocht	Limmen Bight	1644	The ship Limmen, one of the three ships in Tasman's 1644 expedition.	14°50′S 135°34′E	The ship was itself named after the town of Limmen, Holland.
Van Diemen Baai	Van Diemen Gulf	1644	Anthony van Diemen	12°S 132°E	

=== Western Australia ===
Dutch name	English translation	Date	Reason for naming	Coords	Notes
Dirck Hartogs Ree cap.	Dirk Hartog Island	1616	Dirk Hartog	25°50′S 113°05′E	
Dorre Eijlanden	Dorre Island	1616	Translates to "arid islands"	25°03′S 113°06′E	to the north of Dirk Hartog Island, appears on 1697-1726 map
Willems Rivier	Yardie Creek	1618	Willem Jansz, captain of the Duyfken	22°19′23″S 113°48′44″E	Named by captain Lenaert Jacobsz. Jansz was on board, making this his second visit to Australia.
Houtmans Abrolhos	Houtman Abrolhos	1619	Frederick de Houtman, various published explanations for "Abrolhos"	28°43′S 113°47′E	
Rottnest Island	Rat's Nest Island	12/29/1696	Quokkas which appeared to be rats, hence 'rat's nest'	31°59′46″S 115°32′28″E	Named by [Tom Preston]
Zwaanenrivier or Swarte Swaene-Rivier	Swan River	1/10/1697	Black swans	31°56′50″S 115°54′58″E	Named by Willem de Vlamingh. The sighting of the swans was a black swan event.
Landt van de Leeuwin	Cape Leeuwin		Leeuwin (galleon)	34°22′27″S 115°08′09″E	Name used for the land in the south west, now name only used for the cape. The word leeuwin translates as lioness.
Landt van P. Nuyts	Nullarbor		Pieter Nuyts	32°18′S 125°52′E	Nuytsland comprised the entire coast adjoining the Great Australian Bight. The name survives in two smaller, separate areas: Nuytsland Nature Reserve and Nuyts Land District.

=== South Australia ===
Dutch name	English translation	Date	Reason for naming	Coords	Notes
Landt van P. Nuyts	Nullarbor	1/16/1627	Pieter Nuyts	32°S 132°E	Nuytsland was the given to the coast adjoining the Great Australian Bight.
Eijland St. François	St. Francis Island	1627	St. Francis via François Thijssen	32°31′S 133°17′E	
Eijland St. Pieter	St. Peter Island	1627	St. Peter via Pieter Pietersen, the head merchant on Thijssen's expedition	32°17′S 133°34′E	

=== Tasmania ===
Dutch name	English translation	Date	Reason for naming	Coords	Notes
Diemens Land	Van Diemen's Land	11/24/1642	Anthony van Diemen	43°35′S 146°21′E	Now known as Tasmania, after Dutch explorer Abel Tasman
Wits Eijlanden	De Witt Island	1642	Cornelis Jan Witsen, a VOC Commissioner	43°35′S 146°21′E	
Sweers eijland	Sweers Island	1642	named after Salomon Sweers, member of the Council of India		
Eijland den Maet	Maatsuyker Island	12/1/1642	named after Joan Maetsuycker, member of the Council of India	43°39′18″S 146°16′23″E	
Pedra branca		1642	"towards noon we passed two rocks of which the westernmost was like Pedra Branca off the coast of China"	43°51′S 146°58′E	Name is Portuguese in origin, although named by the Dutch Tasman
Boreels-eiland	Boreel Head	11/29/1642	Pieter Boreel, member of the Council of India	43°14′S 148°00′E	Islands now called The Friars, Boreel Head is now the nearby cape on the south of Bruny Island
Storm Baij	Storm Bay	1642	"[Tasman] had almost reached his intended anchorage when a heavy storm arose and he was driven out so far to sea that next morning he could hardly discern the land. It was from this incident that Storm Bay got its name."	43°10′S 147°33′E	
Tasmans Eijland	Tasman Island	1642		43°14′S 148°00′E	
Fredericks Hendricks Baij	Frederick Hendrick Bay	1642		42°51′S 147°58′E	nearby NE cape on Forestier Peninsula still has the name Cape Frederick Hendrick, not near Frederick Henry Bay which is on the other side of the Tasman Peninsula which he never visited. The bay he called Frederick Henry Bay is now Marion Bay
Marias Eijlandt	Maria Island	12/4/1642	Maria Van Aelst, wife of Anthony Van Diemen	42°37′S 148°05′E	
Schoute Eijlandt	Schouten Island	12/4/1642	Justus Schouten, member of the Council of India.	42°18′S 148°16′E	
Van der Lijns Eijland	Vanderlins Island	1642	Cornelis van der Lijn, member of the Council of India	42°13′S 148°18′E	not an island, actually Freycinet Peninsula. When Tasman passed it he was heading east; did not see the connection to the mainland in the north.

== Places named after the Dutch ==
Other places were given Dutch names by later explorers or colonists in honour of the Dutch. These include:

- Duyfken Point - 12°34′S 141°35′E near Weipa where Willem Janszoon first sighted the Australian coast in 1606.
- Tasmania - Australian state, along with 31 other places with the name of Tasman in Tasmania
- Mount Heemskirk and Mount Zeehan - 41°53′S 145°20′E named by George Bass and Matthew Flinders after Abel Tasman's ships Heemskerck and Zeehaen in 1798. It is near where Tasman first sighted Tasmania. The township of Zeehan, Tasmania near Mount Zeehan was established after the discovery of tin, lead and silver deposits in 1890.
- Geelvink Channel was named after a ship, but the ship was named after Joan Geelvinck
- Vansittart Bay on the coast of Western Australia is a unique anomaly. It was named by Phillip Parker King after Nicholas Vansittart, who was an English politician of Dutch descent.

== See also ==
- List of place names of Dutch origin
- First Dutch Expedition to Indonesia
- Second Dutch Expedition to Indonesia
- Dutch East India Company in Indonesia
- European exploration of Australia
- New Holland (Australia)
- Janszoon voyage of 1606
- Voyage of the Pera and Arnhem to Australia in 1623
- History of the Northern Territory
- History of Western Australia
- History of South Australia
- History of Tasmania
