= Heemskirk Range =

Mountains in Western Tasmania, Australia

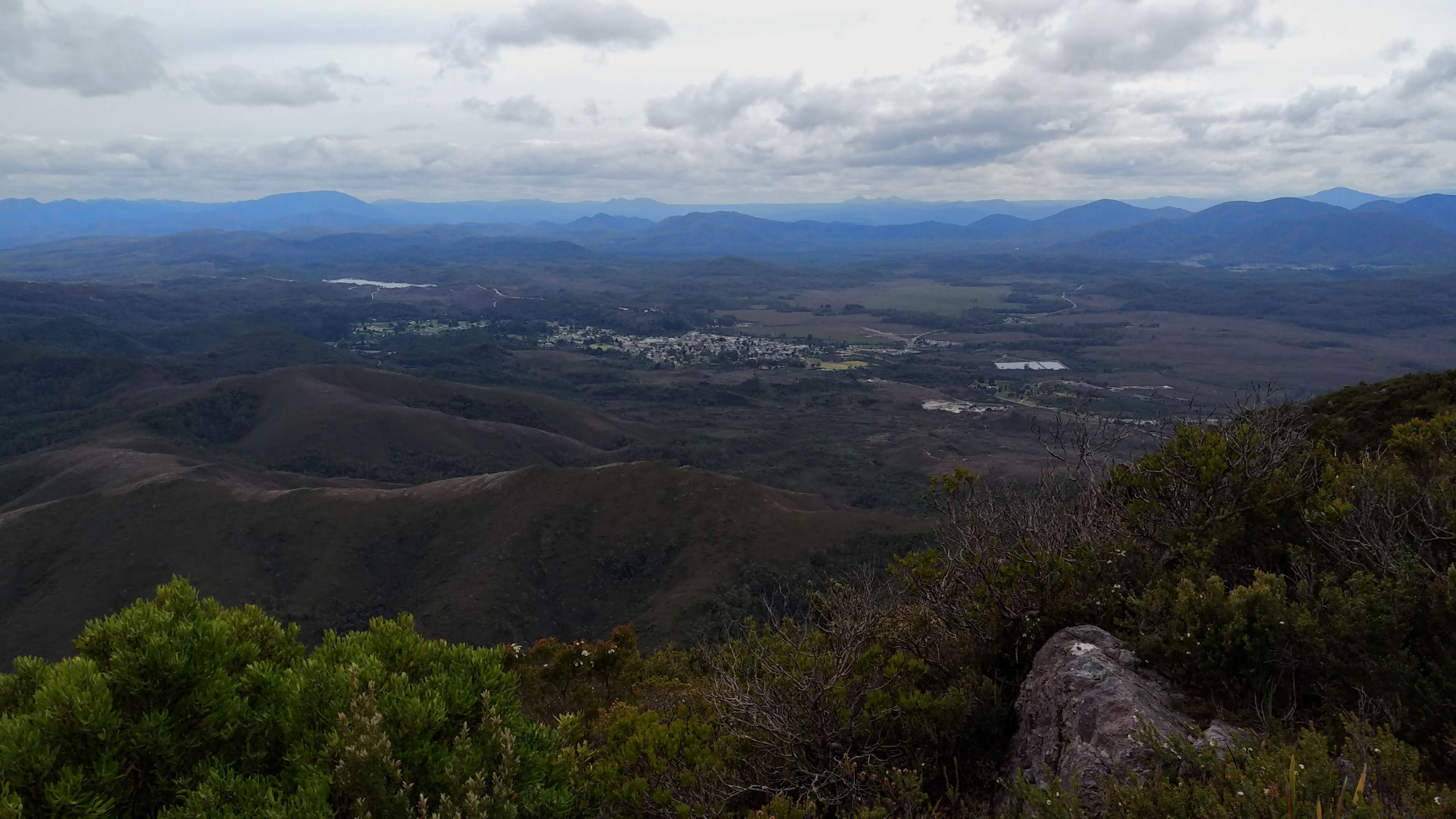

Highest point
- Peak: Mount Agnew
- Elevation: 848 m (2,782 ft); AHD
- Coordinates: 41°50′30″S 145°14′0″E

Geography
- Location within Tasmania
- Country: Australia
- State: Tasmania
- Region: Western Tasmania
- Range coordinates: 41°50′30″S 145°14′0″E
- Parent range: West Coast Range

Geology
- Rock age: Cambrian
- Rock type: Granite

The Heemskirk Range is a mountain range in the Western region of Tasmania, Australia. The main peak of the range is Mount Agnew, which reaches an elevation of 848 metres (2,782 ft) above sea level. The range is named after the Heemskerk, one of the ships used by Dutch explorer Abel Tasman during his voyage to Tasmania in 1642.

The Heemskirk Range lies near the mining towns of Zeehan and Trial Harbour, and the surrounding area has been explored for various minerals, including tin and copper. While several mining operations have been conducted in the area, no major long-term mining projects were established.

== Features ==
The Heemskirk Range features steep, rugged terrain, characteristic of the West Coast Range. The area surrounding the range is largely undeveloped and remote, making it a destination for experienced bushwalkers and hikers.

The range is known for its rich biodiversity and includes several rare plant species, making it an area of interest for conservationists.

== Mountain bike trails ==
The Heemskirk Range became a significant destination for mountain biking with the official opening of the Heemskirk Mountain Bike Trail network in 2022. Spanning approximately 35 kilometres (22 mi), the purpose-built trails cater to a variety of skill levels and wind through the rugged terrain of the range, offering riders a mix of challenging descents, scenic views, and access to Tasmania's remote wilderness.

The development of the trail network was supported by the West Coast Council and state government, as part of efforts to diversify the region's economy, which has historically relied on mining. The trail system has since attracted domestic and international mountain bikers, contributing to the growing adventure tourism industry on Tasmania's West Coast.

The trails have been designed to integrate with the natural landscape, allowing riders to experience the unique flora and fauna of the region. Facilities such as trailheads, car parks, and information kiosks provide support for visitors, ensuring the area is accessible for riders of all levels.

== See also ==
- List of highest mountains of Tasmania
- West Coast Range (Tasmania)
- Zeehan, Tasmania

== Sources ==
- Blainey, Geoffrey (2000). The Peaks of Lyell (6th ed.). Hobart: St. David's Park Publishing. ISBN 0-7246-2265-9.
- Whitham, Charles (1924). Western Tasmania: A Land of Riches and Beauty (3rd ed.). Government Printer.
