= Heemskerk (disambiguation) =

Heemskerk is a municipality and a town in the Netherlands, in the province of North Holland.

It is also a Dutch toponymic surname referring to this town:

Heemskerk

- Femke Heemskerk (born 1987), Dutch swimmer
- Fenny Heemskerk (1919–2007), Dutch chess master
- Frank Heemskerk (born 1969), Dutch politician
- Jan Heemskerk (1810–1897), Dutch politician
- Marianne Heemskerk (born 1944), Dutch swimmer
- Theo Heemskerk (1852–1932), Dutch politician and prime minister

Van Heemskerck/Van Heemskerk

- de:Coenraad van Heemskerck (1646–1702), Dutch diplomat and politician
- Egbert van Heemskerck I (1634–1704), Dutch painter
- Egbert van Heemskerck II (c. 1675 – 1744), Dutch painter
- Jacob van Heemskerk (1567–1607), Dutch explorer
  - HNLMS Jacob van Heemskerk, light cruiser of the Royal Netherlands Navy
- Jacoba van Heemskerck (1876–1923), Dutch painter
- Johan van Heemskerk (1597–1656), Dutch poet
- Maarten van Heemskerck (1499–1574), Dutch painter

== Heemskerck ==
- Heemskerck was Abel Tasman's flagship on his 1642 voyage of discovery
