= Zeehan School of Mines and Metallurgy =

Mining school in Tasmania (1903–1958)

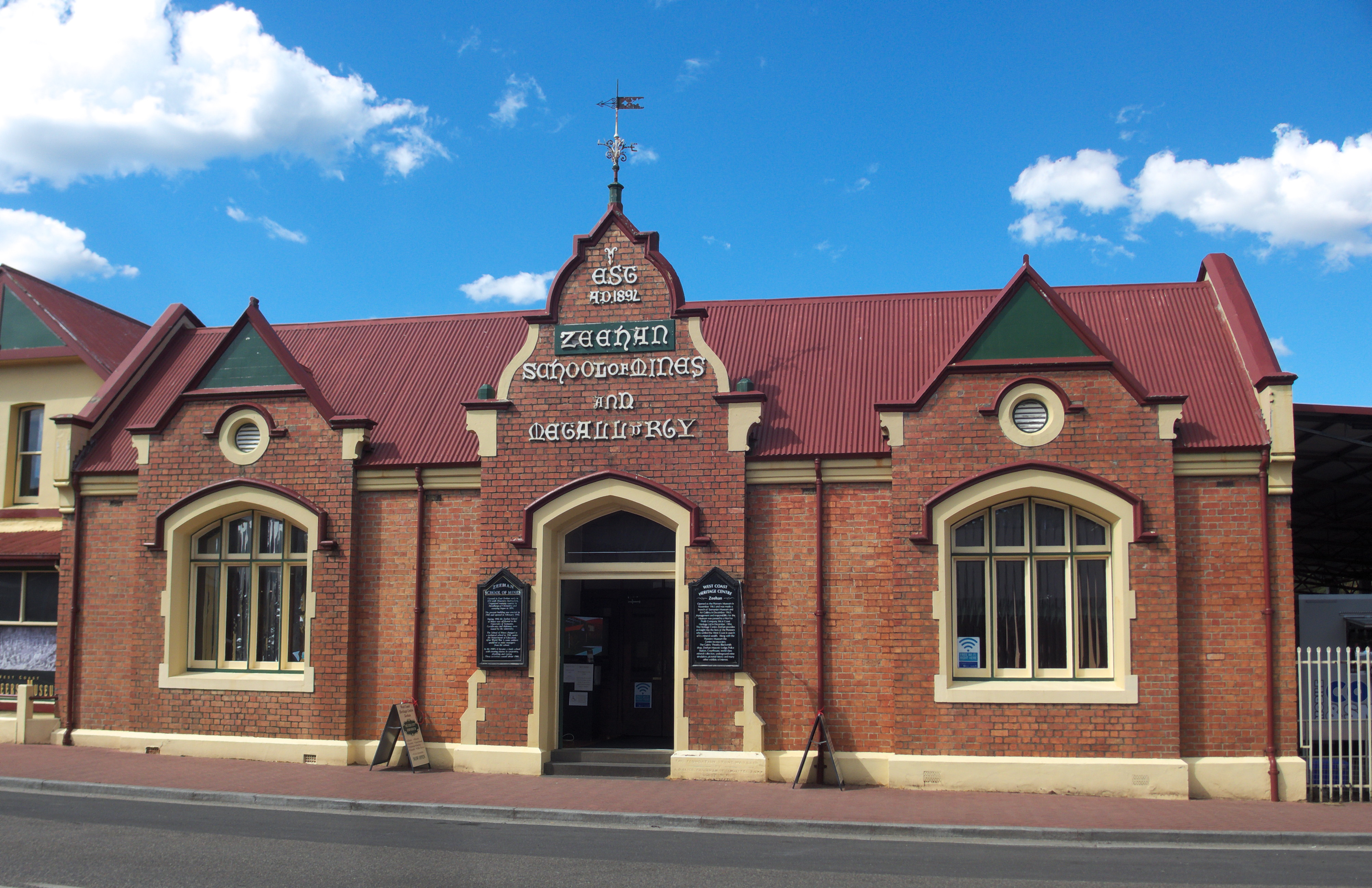
Former School of Mines

The Zeehan School of Mines and Metallurgy was a Mining college in Main Street, Zeehan, West Coast Tasmania, Australia.

It commenced during the height of the silver boom in the Zeehan mineral field.

The committee to found the school was formed in January 1892, by 1896 there were instructors involved, and in February 1903 the building was complete.

Following the decline of the Zeehan mineral field it became part-time by 1921, and it closed in 1958.

The buildings and collections of the college were retained to make up part of what was first the 'West Coast Pioneers Museum' which started in 1965, and which is now known as the West Coast Heritage Centre
