= Granville Harbour Wind Farm =

Wind farm in Tasmania, Australia

- Country: Australia
- Location: Zeehan, Tasmania
- Coordinates: 41.802°S 145.056°E
- Status: Operational
- Construction began: August 2018
- Commission date: December 2020
- Construction cost: $280 million
- Operator: Palisade Investment Partners

Wind farm
- Type: Onshore
- Hub height: 137 metres (449 ft)
- Rotor diameter: 126 metres (413 ft)

Power generation
- Units operational: 31 × 3.6 MW
- Make and model: Vestas V126
- Nameplate capacity: 112 MW
- Capacity factor: 41.63% (2021)
- Annual net output: 408.5 GWh (2021)

External links
- Website: granvilleharbourwindfarm.com.au

Granville Harbour Wind Farm is a wind farm operated by Palisade Investment Partners, on the west coast of Tasmania, Australia.

The facility first generated to the grid on 27 February 2020 with the completion of its first turbine, with the site being fully commissioned and operational in December 2020. The wind farm has 31 wind turbines and have a maximum capacity of 112 MW.

It is located on a site 35 kilometres (22 mi) northwest of Zeehan, Tasmania.

== Operations ==
The generation table uses eljmkt nemlog to obtain generation values for each month. Grid connection started in January 2020, and was fully commissioned in December 2020.

Granville Harbour Wind Farm Generation (MWh)
Year	Total	Jan	Feb	Mar	Apr	May	Jun	Jul	Aug	Sep	Oct	Nov	Dec
2020	216,847	0*	704*	5,265*	11,461*	22,341*	29,220*	23,440*	78*	35,447*	22,415*	30,988*	35,488*
2021	408,465	29,023	24,288	28,624	33,850	41,981	31,432	41,395	47,711	39,424	38,754	24,846	27,137

Note: Asterisk indicates power output was limited during the month.

== See also ==
- Wind power in Australia
