= Renison Bell =

Mine in Tasmania, Australia

- Location in Tasmania
- Location: Melba Flats, Tasmania, Australia; 41°48′S 145°25′E
- Products: Tin
- Opened: 2008
- Company: Metals X Limited
- Website: metalsx.com.au

Renison Bell is an underground tin mine and locality on the West Coast of Tasmania, Australia.

== History ==
In 1890, tin-bearing gossan was found near Argent River by George Renison Bell. He claimed land and formed the Renison Bell Prospecting Association.

Renison Bell Post Office opened on 1 July 1908 and closed in 1976.

In 1934, "Paddy" O'Dea amalgamated adjoining leases and mines into the Renison Associated Tin Mines NL.

In the 1970s, Renison Bell gave its name to the historical conglomerate RGC (Renison Goldfields Consolidated) which once owned and operated mines in Tasmania, Western Australia, Queensland, Northern Territory, Florida, West Virginia, Papua New Guinea, and Indonesia. RGC sold the Renison Bell Mine to Murchison United NL, a Brisbane-based Australian company, in August 1998.

Murchison United operated the Rension Bell Mine during the period of lowest tin prices in history. In July 2003, Murchison United went into administration and the mine production ceased. April 2004 saw the purchase of Renison Bell by Bluestone Tin Limited. Bluestone Tin Limited operated the mine and mill at Rension Bell, under continuing low tin prices, until placing the operation into 'care and maintenance' in September 2005. Bluestone Tin Limited, now part-owned by Metals X Limited as part of a joint venture with Yunnan Tin Co., recommissioned the mill and mine in 2008. The first tin produced in August 2008.

== Location ==
It is located on the former Emu Bay Railway line, now called the Melba line, which is owned and operated by TasRail east of Zeehan - not far from Melba Flats, which is the current terminus of that railway line.

== See also ==
- Rosebery, Tasmania
- Zeehan
- West Coast Tasmania Mines
