= Frank Long =

Prospector in Tasmania, Australia

Frank Long was a trackcutter and prospector. In 1882 he discovered the Zeehan-Dundas silver-lead field on the West Coast of Tasmania.

== Life and career ==
Frank Long was Tasmanian, born to ex-convicts in Launceston around 1844. He spent his early years in Campbell Town. Long was a member of Charles Sprent's Mount Heemskirk expedition in 1876 and was known as a hardy and strong bushman.

=== Discovery of the Zeehan-Dundas Silver-Lead Field ===
Long discovered deposits of silver and lead in the Zeehan-Dundas silver-lead field. A nearby encampment grew, and the Mount Zeehan Post Office opened on 1 August 1888. Although Long's mineral discoveries generated wealth for many people, his later years were affected by rheumatism and alcoholism. The community of Zeehan helped Long secure a government pension so he could live out his days in dignity. Long was known as "the father of Zeehan" when he died in 1908.

== Legacy ==
The Frank Long Memorial at Zeehan received $5,000 upgrade in 2018.

== See also ==
- Thomas Bather Moore
