= Zeehan =

- Town
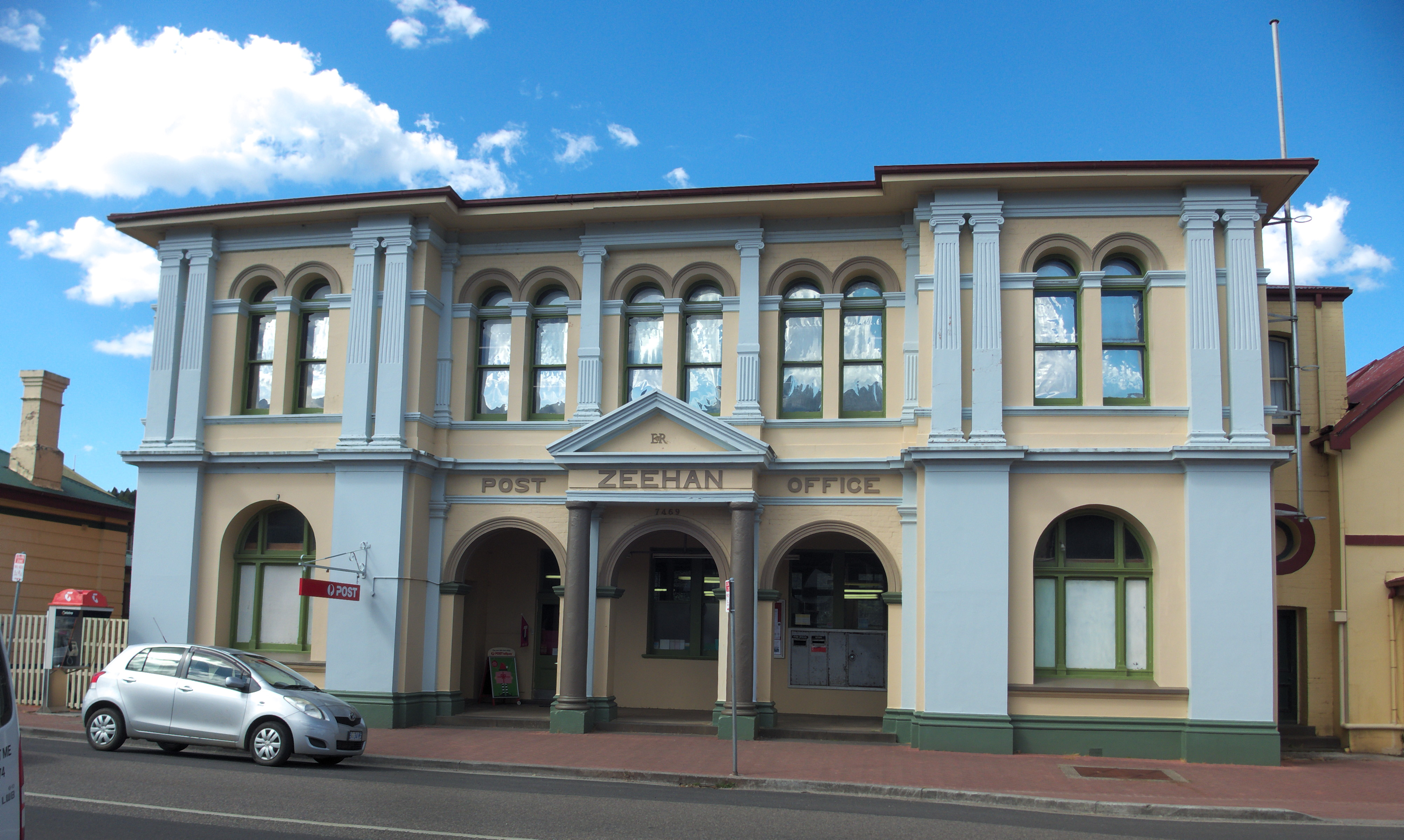
- Zeehan Post Office, opened 1 August 1888

- Coordinates: 41°53′S 145°20′E
- Country: Australia
- State: Tasmania
- LGA: West Coast Council
- Location: 286 km (178 mi) NW of Hobart; 139 km (86 mi) SW of Burnie; 38 km (24 mi) NW of Queenstown

Government
  - State electorate: Braddon
  - Federal division: Braddon

Area
  - Total: 1.8 km^{2} (0.69 sq mi)
- Elevation: 172 m (564 ft)

Population
  - Total: 702 (UCL 2021)
  - Density: 404.4/km^{2} (1,047/sq mi)
- Postcode: 7469
- Mean max temp: 15.2 °C (59.4 °F)
- Mean min temp: 6.3 °C (43.3 °F)
- Annual rainfall: 2,445.5 mm (96.28 in)

Zeehan /ˈziːən/ is a town on the west coast of Tasmania, Australia 139 kilometres (86 mi) south-west of Burnie. It is part of the West Coast Council, along with the seaport Strahan and neighbouring mining towns of Rosebery and Queenstown.

== History ==
The greater Zeehan area was inhabited by the indigenous Peerapper and Tommeginne clans of the North West group for over 10,000 years prior to the British colonisation of Tasmania. They were greatly coastal peoples, residing in small numbers on a diet consisting of muttonbirds, seals, swan eggs and cider gum, and constructed bark huts when strong westerly winds brought about rain and icy temperatures.

=== European naming ===
On 24 November 1642, Dutch explorer Abel Tasman became the first European explorer to sight and document the Heemskirk and West Coast Ranges. Tasman sailed his ships close to the coastal area which today encompasses the Southwest Conservation Area, south of Macquarie Harbour, but was unable to send a landing party ashore due to poor weather and did not make contact with any South West Tasmanian groups. In their circumnavigation of Tasmania between 1798 and 1799, George Bass and Matthew Flinders named the Heemskirk Ranges mountains Mount Heemskirk and Mount Zeehan after Tasman's ships, the warship Heemskerck (itself named after Jacob van Heemskerck, whose surname means "from Heemskerk") and the 200-tonne (200-long-ton; 220-short-ton) fluyt Zeehaen (Old Dutch for "Sea Rooster") in honour of Tasman's voyage of exploration. Although Dutch in origin, Bass and Flinders' Anglicised naming of Mount Heemskirk and Mount Zeehan created some of the oldest British place names in Tasmania. (Note: Only a few Dutch place names in Tasmania originate from Tasman's 1642 voyage. Although some place names originate from Bruni d'Entrecasteaux's French expedition in 1792, most place names were not assigned in Van Diemen's Land until after the settlement of Hobart Town at Risdon Cove in 1803. It was not until after the 1815 discovery of Macquarie Harbour by explorer and mariner James Kelly that many place names on the West Coast were assigned.)

=== Mining boom ===
Tin was discovered nearby at Mount Bischoff in 1871 and at Mount Heemskirk in 1879. Deposits of silver and lead were discovered in the area by Frank Long in 1882 and Mount Zeehan Post Office opened on 1 August 1888. The township was named Zeehan in 1890 and over the following decades, quickly expanded due to its proximity to the Zeehan mineral field. The peak period for mining was up to the First World War, when 159 companies operated at the town's peak and the town stock exchange had 60 members. With a main street over 3.2 kilometres (2.0 mi) long, the township claimed over 20 hotels, several pubs, a hospital, and two theatres, the Gaiety Theatre and Theatre Royal. It developed a friendly rivalry with Queenstown, and while the silver boom lasted it was known as the Silver City. In the first decade of the twentieth century it was the third largest town in Tasmania, after Hobart and Launceston. Sharing a mineral field and railway, the mining locality of Dundas was historically paired with Zeehan. A port was established at Trial Harbour for Zeehan, however its exposure to the Roaring Forties made the site a vulnerable anchorage. After the construction of the Strahan–Zeehan Railway, Strahan became Zeehan's favourable port. The mines earned some two hundred thousand dollars per year for two decades, before progressively declining till the 1960s, when the last mines, Montana and Oceana were closed.

=== 1981 bushfires ===
In February 1981, a major bushfire caused significant damage to the West Coast of Tasmania, including Zeehan. The fire had been burning in surrounding bushland for more than a week before being driven towards the township by strong north-westerly winds of up to 45 km/h (28 mph) and extreme heat. Reaching Zeehan on multiple fronts, the fire spread rapidly with little warning to residents.

Between 36 and 40 houses were destroyed, along with vehicles, a caravan and mining equipment, and power and water supplies were severed. Most of the town's population (of approximately 2,000 to 2,500 people) was evacuated to the sports oval, airstrip, hotels and public buildings. Firefighting efforts involved volunteer brigades, forestry workers, Hydro Electric Commission staff and miners from nearby Renison Bell. No deaths or serious injuries were reported. The Tasmanian Government and Australian Government provided emergency relief and longer-term assistance, including temporary housing and funding for the reconstruction of community facilities such as the Scout Hall.

=== Decline ===
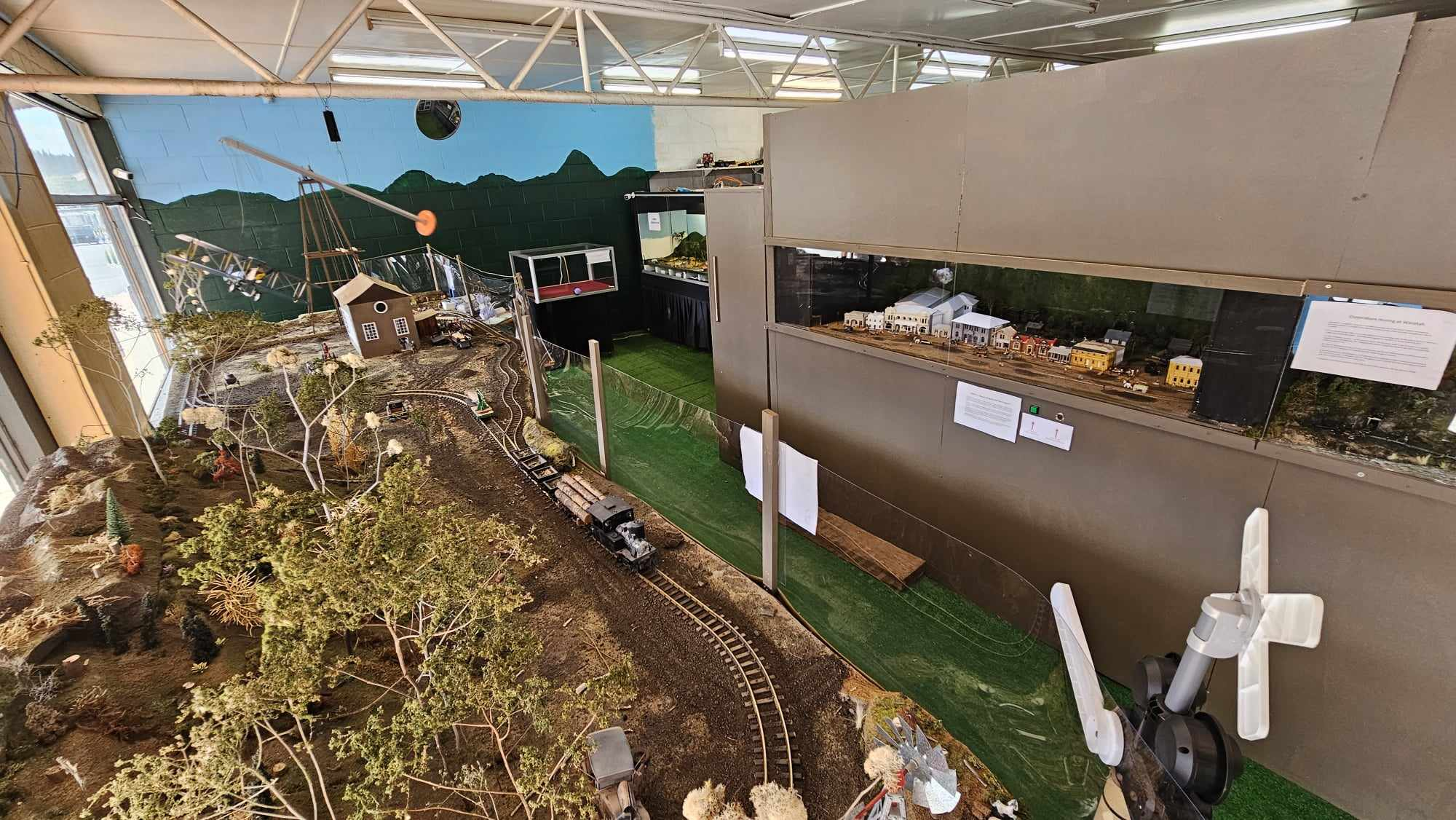

The population of Zeehan-Dundas peaked at 10,000 in about 1910, over ten times the current population. In the 1970s it saw increased activity due to operations at the nearby Renison Bell tin mine, and again in the 1990s. It was the administrative centre of the Municipality of Zeehan until the early 1900s, when it merged with surrounding councils to form West Coast Council. At the 2011 census, Zeehan had a population of 728. The town was subject to several acts of arson in the 2010s, one of which saw damage to historic buildings dating back to the 1890s. The township has had its share of criminal characters-with various acts of manslaughter, assault and aggravated burglary in its history both past and present. During the COVID-19 pandemic, ten parcels of land, some as cheap as $8000, were sold by the West Coast Council as a means to attract new residents. It is hoped tourism will continue to bolster the local economy, with a new takeaway (Wildz Takeaway) open on the main road, and the creation of The Western Echo newspaper. A History of the West Coast model railway and diorama display is now open opposite the museum and is being built as a tourist attraction. The area has also seen an influx of visitors since the establishment in 2022 of several mountain biking trails around Zeehan, Trial Harbour and Queenstown.

== Pollution ==
In 2021, a study of the levels of pollution in the lakes of northwest Tasmania found a level of contamination with lead copper, cadmium and arsenic equal to the most severely polluted lakes in the world. Owen Tarn and Basin Lake near Queenstown were the worst, but Dove Lake, Lake Dobson, Lake Cygnus, and Perched Lake were also affected. These lakes are in the mountainous areas up to 130 kilometres (81 mi) downwind from Zeehan and Queenstown and have been adulterated by atmospheric pollution mainly caused by open cut mining proceeding uninhibited till finally controlled by the Environment Protection Act of 1973. Recent bushfires have caused an increase in atmospheric mercury levels to three or four times the pre-industrial level due to the release of mercury previously locked in trees. Evidence indicates the area has suffered from dangerous levels of environmental pollution for over a century.

== Roads ==
Zeehan is connected with the north coast of Tasmania by the Murchison Highway, to Strahan by the Zeehan-Strahan Road, and Queenstown by the Zeehan Highway.

== Railways ==
Zeehan was an important railway location—the end of the Emu Bay Railway, and the beginning of the government-owned Strahan-Zeehan Railway service that connected to Strahan and Regatta Point, where the Mount Lyell Railway connected to Queenstown. Also at early stages of the town's history, a series of timber trams spread out from Zeehan towards the Pieman River as well as a number of other locations.

Some of the smaller railway operations east of Zeehan were unique. One had the honour of having the first Garratt locomotive designed and built for its operations.

After the government rail connection between Zeehan and Strahan closed, the Mount Lyell Company trucked its copper ore to the Emu Bay Railway terminus at Melba Flats, a few kilometres east of Zeehan.

== Newspapers ==
The 'Western Echo' newspaper launched in November 2021, with local residents' contributing significantly to the content. It represents the West Coast communities of Zeehan, Queenstown, Strahan, Rosebery, Tullah and Waratah. The historical Zeehan and Dundas Herald ran from 1890 to 1922, with the region being served intermittently by other print newspapers from the 1980s.

== Economy ==
The Zeehan economy relies heavily on the money brought in by local and West Coast Tasmanian regional tourism.

The mining of base metals and tin are significant contributors to the community. Mines include:

- Bluestone Tin's Renison Bell tin mine
- Mallee Resources Avebury nickel mine.
- Tartana Minerals Limited and Intec Zeehan Zinc Residues – re-treatment of the Zeehan Zinc smelter slag and matte.
- Australian Hualong Pty Ltd – Comstock Mine.

In 2018, construction began on the $280 million Granville Harbour Wind Farm, Tasmania's tallest wind farm, located 35 km north-west of Zeehan. This took Tasmania to 100 percent renewable energy, and in 2020, it was Australia's best performing wind farm.

In 2022, the Avebury nickel mine re-opened after an extended period in care and maintenance. In June 2024, due to the falling nickel price, Avebury again entered care and maintenance, with the loss of approximately 180 jobs.

== Tourism features ==
The main streetscape of Zeehan is one significant feature of the town, featuring many boom-time and pre-Federation buildings. Among these attractions is the Gaiety Theatre, Grand Hotel and the West Coast Heritage Centre (formerly known as the West Coast Pioneers Museum) located within the former Zeehan School of Mines and Metallurgy building. The West Coast Heritage Centre features examples of Tasmania's mineral emblem, the valuable crystal crocoite, as well as other geological specimens and historic mining artefacts.

== Notable people ==
The famed concert pianist Eileen Joyce was born in Zeehan, and Eileen Joyce Memorial Park in Zeehan was named in her honour. Reverend Dorothy McRae-McMahon, Australia's first openly gay clergy member and human rights activist was born in Zeehan.

== Notable events ==
Parts of a 1925 Australian silent film, Jewelled Nights were shot on Savage River, north of the town in the Tarkine rainforest.

Bushfires were reported near Zeehan in 1896, 1908, 1977, 1980 and 2006. In November 2012 the town was threatened by bushfires from two directions. However, the alert was later removed. There were also bushfires in February 1890 (diary of Edward Jennings and this https://nla.gov.au/nla.news-article13761103).

Bushfires also threatened Zeehan in 2019, with the fire coming approximately 2 kilometres from the town. Residents were evacuated to Queenstown and Strahan after it was decided that the school was no longer a safe locale for residents to gather.

2023 crime drama, dark comedy series, Bay of Fires, starring Marta Dusseldorp was filmed at locations in Zeehan, Queenstown and Strahan in 2022.

== Climate ==
Zeehan has a cool, wet oceanic climate (Cfb) with cool damp summers and long, chilly, rainy winters. Snow falls on an average of 2.4 days a year.

Climate data for Zeehan Post Office (1908–1968, rainfall 1890–1968); 172 m AMSL; 41.88° S, 145.33° E
Month	Jan	Feb	Mar	Apr	May	Jun	Jul	Aug	Sep	Oct	Nov	Dec	Year
Mean daily maximum °C (°F)	19.5 (67.1)	20.2 (68.4)	18.4 (65.1)	15.4 (59.7)	13.2 (55.8)	11.2 (52.2)	10.8 (51.4)	11.5 (52.7)	13.3 (55.9)	14.9 (58.8)	16.3 (61.3)	18.2 (64.8)	15.2 (59.4)
Mean daily minimum °C (°F)	8.8 (47.8)	9.5 (49.1)	8.4 (47.1)	6.9 (44.4)	5.5 (41.9)	3.8 (38.8)	3.4 (38.1)	3.8 (38.8)	4.8 (40.6)	5.7 (42.3)	6.9 (44.4)	8.2 (46.8)	6.3 (43.3)
Average precipitation mm (inches)	137.6 (5.42)	113.8 (4.48)	151.0 (5.94)	215.7 (8.49)	237.8 (9.36)	252.2 (9.93)	264.9 (10.43)	262.5 (10.33)	229.7 (9.04)	221.2 (8.71)	189.6 (7.46)	165.3 (6.51)	2,441.3 (96.1)

== Gallery ==
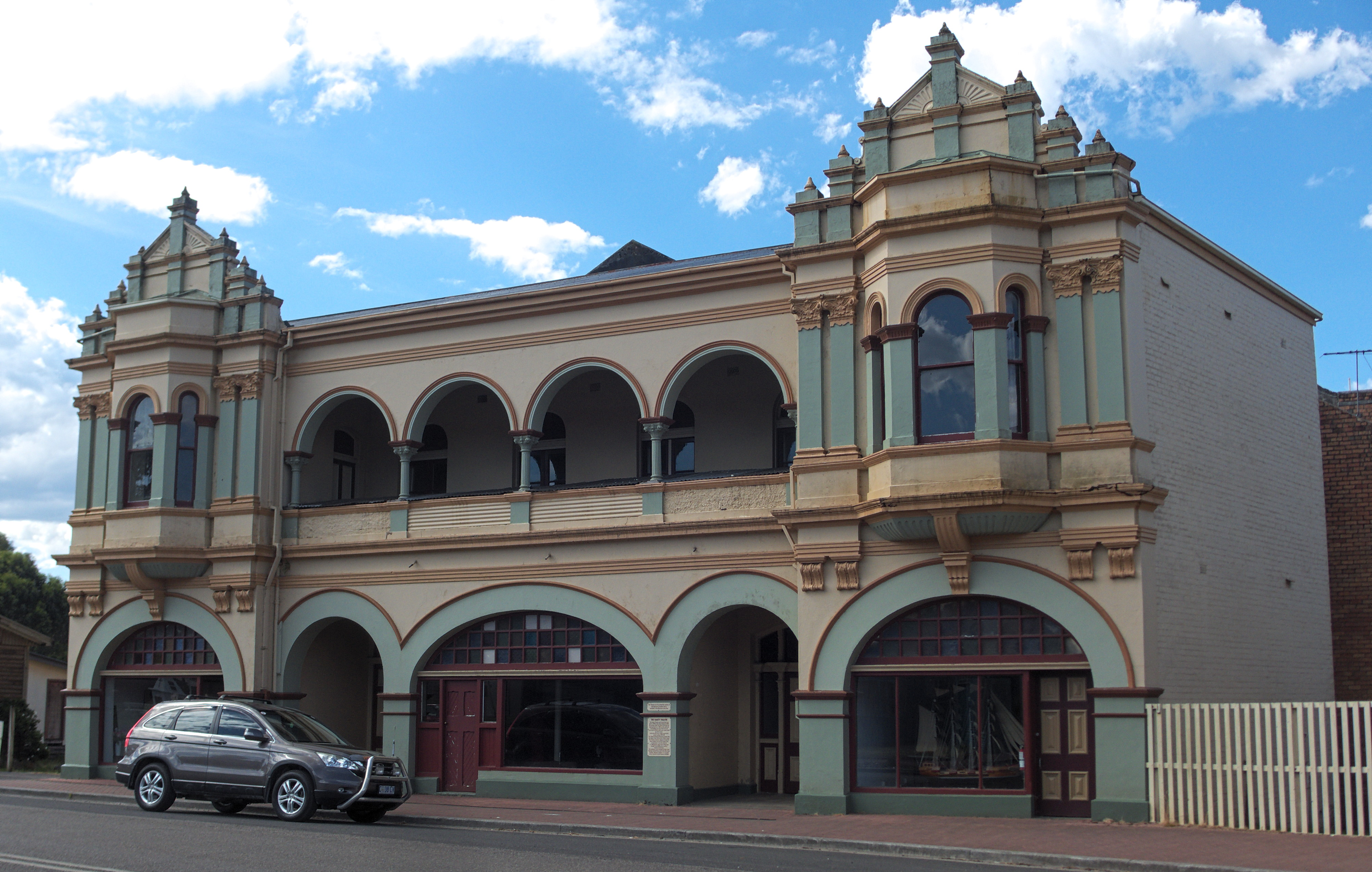
The Gaiety Theatre, Zeehan, constructed in 1898. Screened The Story of the Kelly Gang, considered the world's first feature length film, on its original run in 1907.

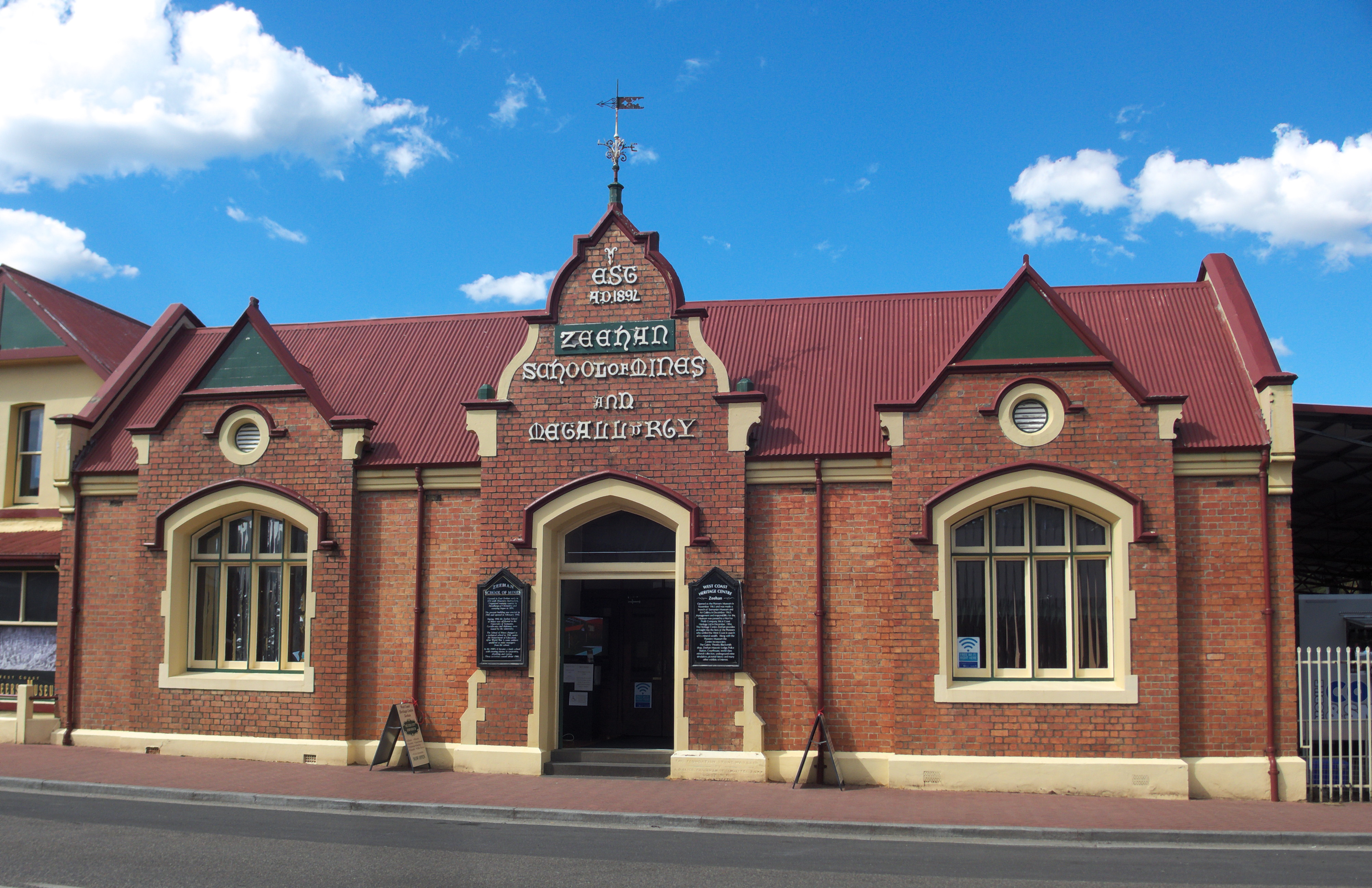
Zeehan School of Mines and Metallurgy, constructed in 1903

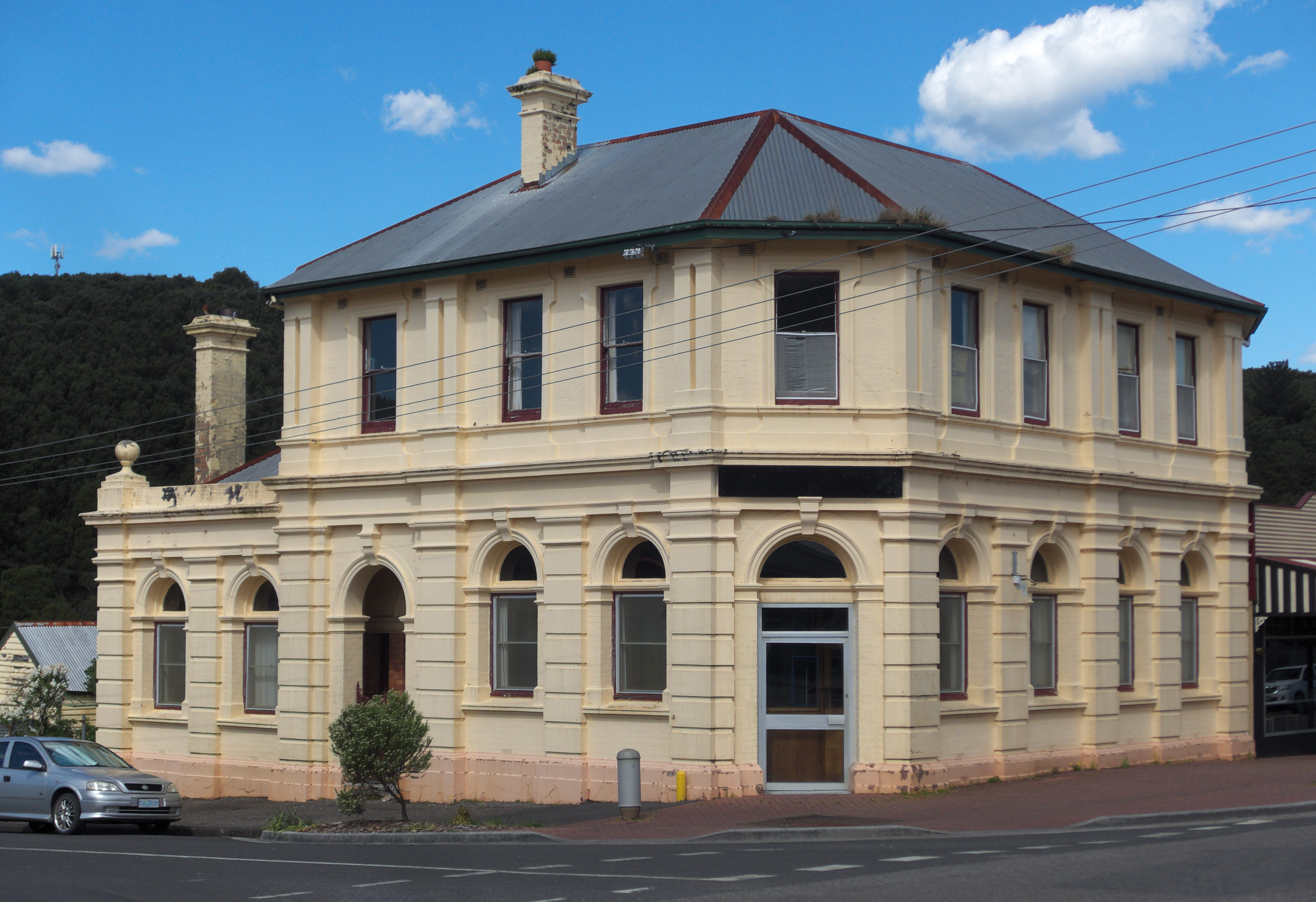
Former bank at 112 Main Street Zeehan. It was constructed by the Commercial Bank of Tasmania and opened in 1899. It was merged into the English, Scottish and Australian Bank in 1921 and the ANZ Bank in 1970, but the branch was closed by ANZ in late 2016.

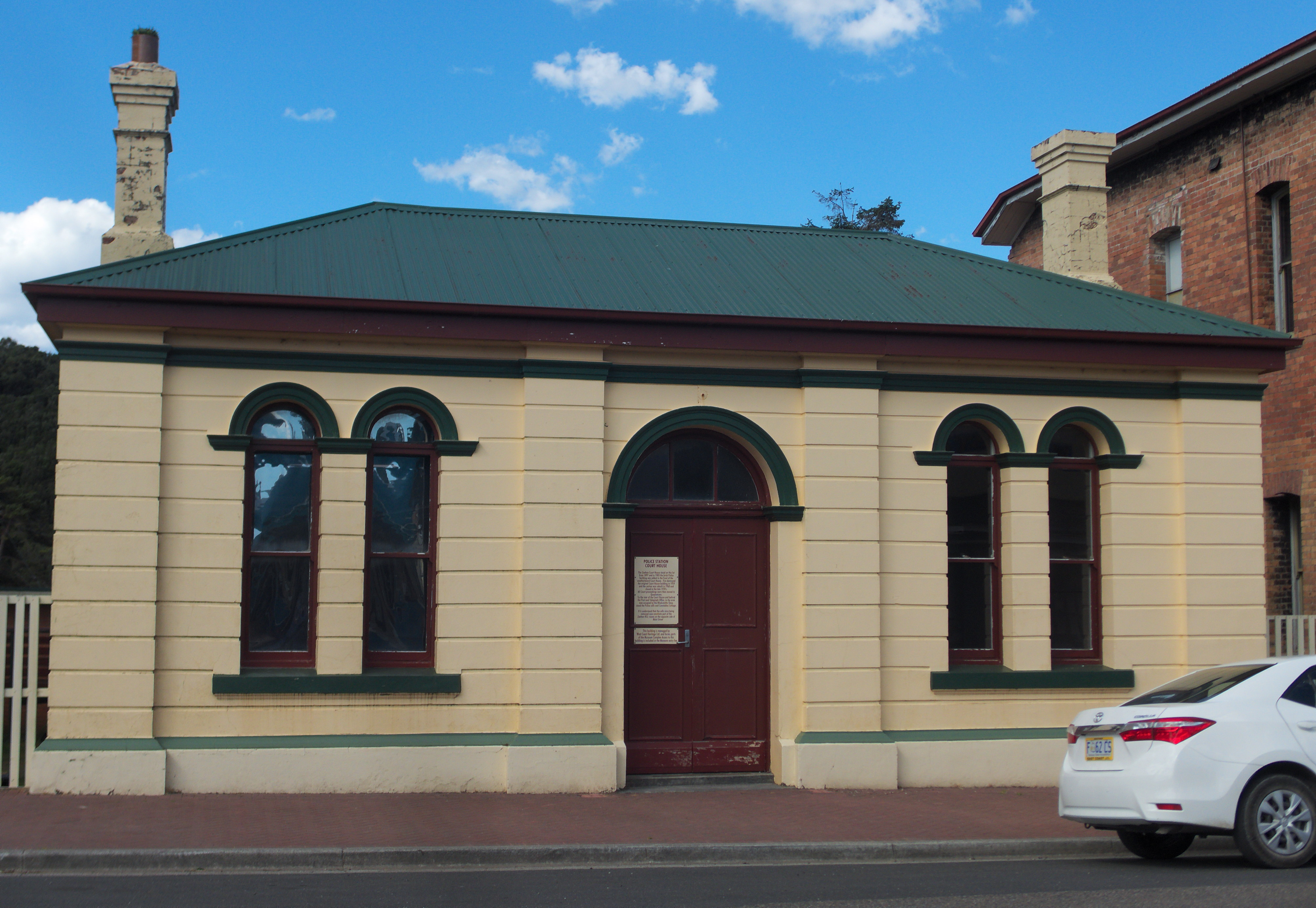
Former Zeehan Police Station and Court House, now part of the West Coast Heritage Centre

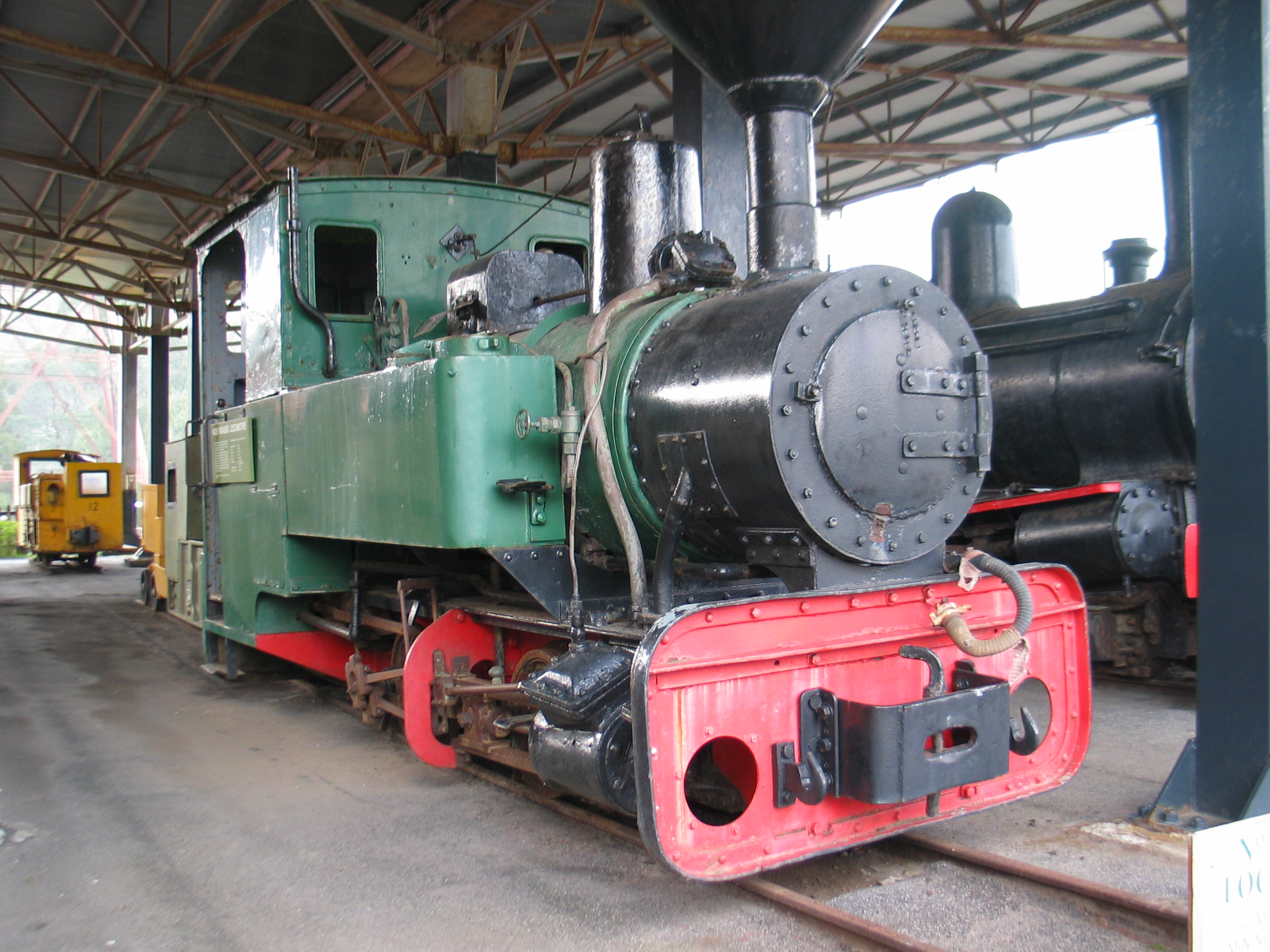
Locomotive,
West Coast Pioneers Museum

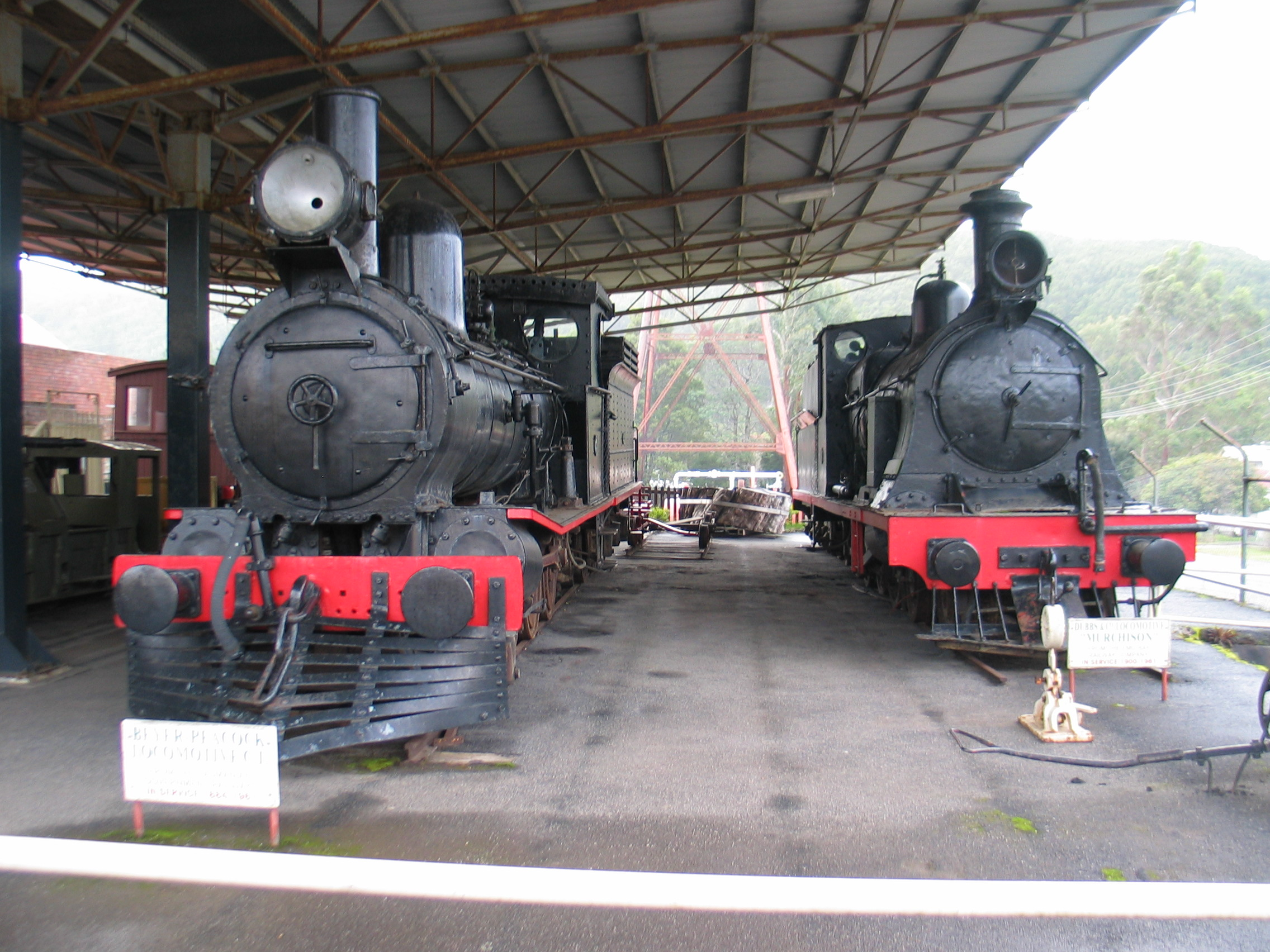
Beyer Peacock and Dubbs locomotives,
West Coast Pioneers Museum

== See also ==
- Railways on the West Coast of Tasmania
- West Coast Tasmania Mines
