= West Coast Heritage Centre =

Museum consisting of a group of historic buildings in Zeehan, Tasmania, Australia

West Coast Heritage Centre (formerly known as the West Coast Pioneers Museum) is a complex of buildings and collections in Main Street of Zeehan, Tasmania in West Coast Tasmania in Australia.

The centre was managed by the company West Coast Heritage Limited in 2016.

== History ==
The closure of the Zeehan School of Mines and Metallurgy in the 1960s saw the founding of the Pioneers Museum in 1964.

The centre included seven hectares and housing over 30 themed displays and exhibit.

The components of the centre include:

- Collections of the West Coast Pioneers' Museum
- The buildings of the former Zeehan School of Mines and Metallurgy
- Zeehan Post Office
- Zeehan Courthouse
- Gaiety Theatre
- Grand Hotel
- Covered area of preserved railway locomotives, rolling stock and machinery
- Mining explosive display
- Art exhibitions and exhibits
