= Comstock Mine =

Mining operation in Tasmania, Australia

Coordinates: 41°53′36″S 145°17′00″E

Comstock mining operation in West Coast, Tasmania is at mine site is situated 4 km west of the township of Zeehan along Trial Harbour Road and neighbours the Avebury Nickel mine a further 4 kilometres to the south-west.

== Mine ==
The Comstock lead, zinc mine is an operating and producing mine. The Comstock area is held under mining lease 5M/2007 covering over 245 hectares.

The mine consists of a gravity processing plant, tailings dam, offices, access roads, power lines and a number of open cut pits. These open cuts were the result of previous mining operations and most run north-east with one having a dog-leg to the north. At its deepest point, the Alisons open cut is around 30 metres below the surface.

== Historical ==
Mining in the Comstock District between the Heemskirk Granite, and the township of Zeehan; an area of approximately 65 km^{2}, commenced in the late 1880s after the discovery of silver, lead veins and continued through until 1914. In the 1940s interest surged again with the discovery of cassiterite mineralisation. Mining for tin, lead, zinc, silver and copper deposits occurred sporadically through until the 1960s. During this period ore was mined from over 40 mines in the Comstock and Zeehan mineral fields.

There have been other mines and locations with Comstock as part of their name on the west coast of Tasmania.
