= Corrick Family Entertainers =

New Zealand troupe of musicians and entertainers

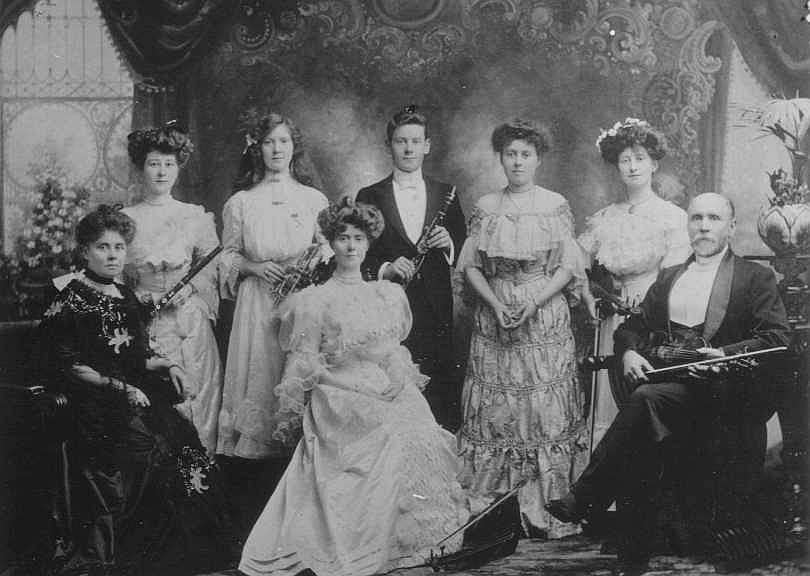
The Corrick Family Entertainers, c. 1905

The Corrick Family was a troupe of musicians and entertainers from Christchurch, New Zealand. They toured widely throughout New Zealand, Australia, India, Southeast Asia and England from 1898 to 1915. They advertised themselves variously as The Corricks, The Corrick Family, The Corrick Family Entertainers, and The Marvellous Corricks.

Consisting of two parents and their eight children, the Corricks regularly received enthusiastic reviews from the Press. Their performances included singing, dancing, handbell ringing, comic sketches and film presentations, as well as the playing of various musical instruments. Alice was acclaimed as the star singing performer throughout their early touring years, however after her marriage and retirement in 1913, youngest sister Elsie quickly rose to become the outstanding performer.

== The Family ==
Albert Corrick was born in Somerset, England. In 1862, at the age of 14, he immigrated to New Zealand with his family on the 'Mermaid', arriving in Lyttelton on 26 December. The family settled in Christchurch, where they became active in the city's musical life. Albert went on to pursue a career as a music teacher, church organist and composer.

In February 1877, acting as the conductor of a local church choir, he married Sarah Alice Calvert, a 23-year-old singer in the choir. Sarah, like Albert, had emigrated with her family from her native Durham in England, arriving in Lyttelton on the Zealandia in November 1859. Albert and Sarah opened an academy of music in Colombo Street, Christchurch, importing sheet music and teaching musical instruments. By 1879, they were immersed in the local church and musical scene, and started to conduct sacred concerts.

Albert and Sarah raised a family of seven daughters and one son: (Note: Their first child, in 1877, was stillborn, and another, Albert Sydney Austin, born 24 June 1881, survived less than seven months.)

- Emily Eleanor Gertrude ('Gertie'), born 5 December 1878
- Alice May, born 4 March 1880
- Amy Beatrice, born 11 November 1882
- Ethel Mildred, born 20 September 1884
- Henry John Leonard ('Leonard', 'Sonny'), born 26 October 1886
- Ruby Florence Elizabeth, born 1 May 1888
- Jessie Winifred, born 27 October 1892, and
- Elsie Collingwood, born 31 August 1894

== Early concerts ==
Albert and Sarah raised their children to have a keen appreciation of music, and all the children were encouraged to play various instruments, and to sing and dance. (Note: Ruby developed breathing problems as a child, so Albert decided to teach her the French horn and the cornet as a treatment. This proved successful.)

Soon realizing that his children had considerable talent, Albert organised local church and charity concerts featuring the family, which met with warm approval from the local public and press. In particular, young Alice was attracting praise for her beautiful voice, as noted in 1897 in the Ellesmere Guardian.

In April 1898, at the suggestion of a Corrick relation, (Note: Searell married Sarah’s niece, Emily Jane Wood) architect Thomas Searell, Alice visited Hobart, Tasmania, and sang at the Town Hall under Vice-Regal patronage. By public demand, Alice's stay in Tasmania stretched out to several months, and she gave numerous concerts around the state. At her farewell concert in Hobart in November 1898 she was directly compared to renowned Tasmania singer Madame Amy Sherwin.

== Tours ==
=== New Zealand ===
In 1899, the family started a series of performing tours of New Zealand, visiting cities and towns throughout the country. These tours lasted over three years, and set a punishing pace that would be maintained over the years to come. Even the youngest daughter, Elsie, drew attention, singing solo on stage aged just four years.

=== Australia ===
In April 1902, again at the suggestion of Thomas Searell, the Corricks left New Zealand to commence a tour of Australia. (The youngest daughters, Jessie and Elsie, were left in the care of an aunt.) Travelling on the Mokoia to Hobart, they gave their first performance as a family on 21 April at the Mechanics' Institute. It was during their initial five-day Hobart season that the description "The Marvellous Corricks" first appeared; this name was to become a standard moniker for the family during its later tours.

In early May 1902, the Corricks set out on a short tour of Tasmania, and gave their first performance in Launceston – the city which was later to become their home – on 26 May. In November that year they set out on their first 'grand tour' of Australia, taking in Victoria, New South Wales and Queensland between 1902 and 1905. Travelling initially by bus and train, the family later invested in several Model T Fords to carry themselves and their ever-growing array of dresses, instruments and equipment, thus becoming the first motorized troupe in Australia. As their popularity grew, Albert started to employ the services of an advance agent, who would travel ahead of the family to arrange bookings for venues, accommodation, and advance advertising.

In May 1905 the family returned to Tasmania to take a five-month break from performing, their first significant holiday in over four years of regular touring. October 1905 saw the Corricks departed on their second major tour of Australia, heading initially to Victoria, then on to South Australia throughout 1906, and Western Australia during 1907; that same year included an extended tour of the outback goldfields of that state.

In September 1907, the second-youngest daughter, Jessie, joined the family on tour. The same month, the family decided to travel overseas, and embarked on a short tour of India and the Far East. For the next few months they performed in India, Ceylon, Balochistan (part of modern Pakistan), Malaysia, and Singapore.

In December 1908, the family was holidaying in England with family, and "furthering their studies under the best masters." Alice took private lessons from Signor Moretti of the Royal Academy of Music, and achieved high praise from Madame Mathilde Marchesi of Paris.

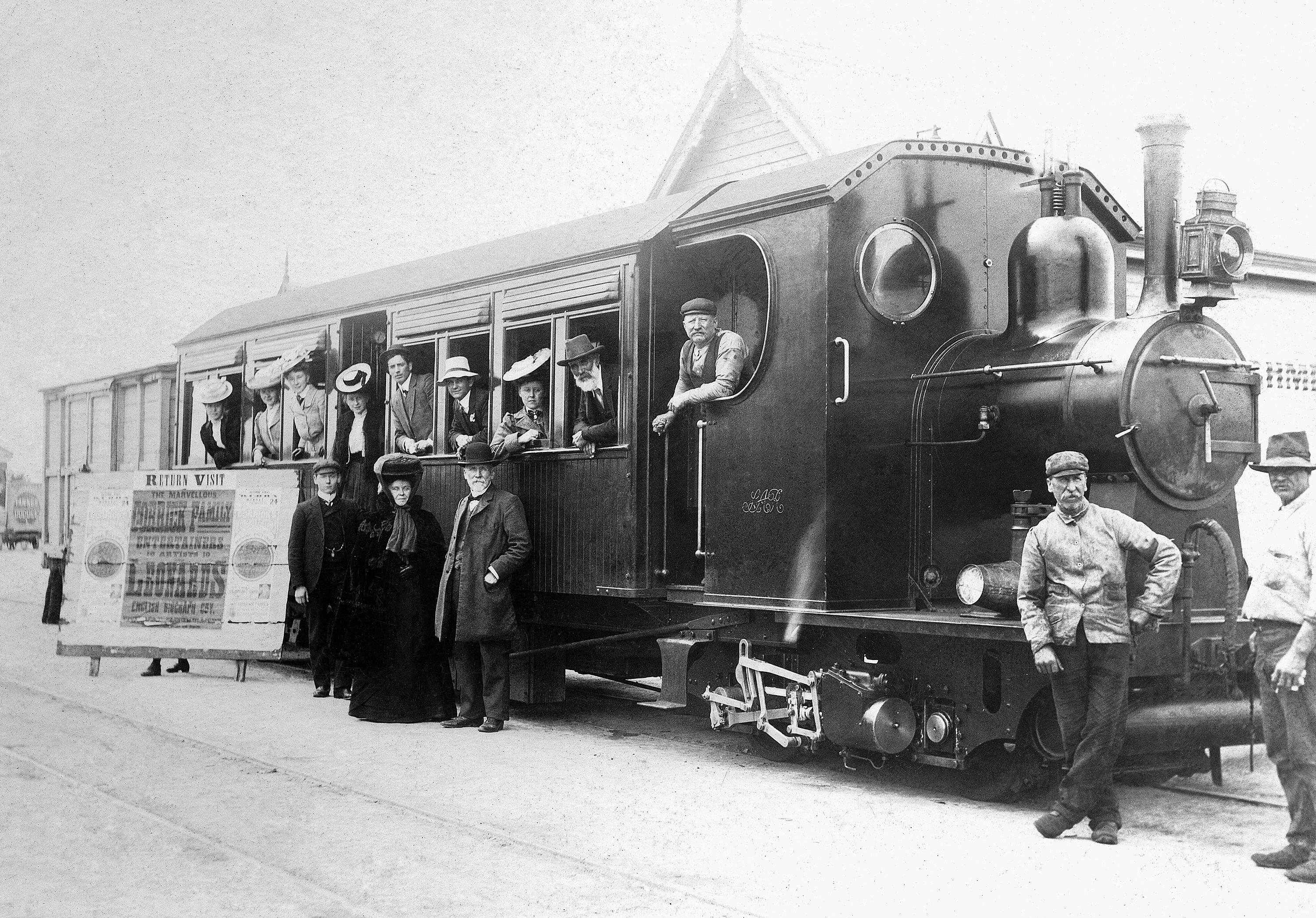
During their Australian tour starting in June 1909, the Corricks hired a "steam motor coach" (railcar) and goods van to travel between settlements in the north of South Australia, which were devoid of made roads.

The Corricks returned to Perth in June 1909, and immediately set out on another Australian tour, their longest yet, taking in the Western Australian goldfields, South Australia, Tasmania, Victoria, New South Wales and Queensland. In November 1912, the youngest daughter, Elsie, finally joined the family, making it complete for the first time since their early tours in New Zealand. After leaving school in New Zealand in 1910, Elsie had trained at the Garcia School of Music in Sydney, under the director Madame Ellen Christian, Nellie Melba's first teacher. Elsie rapidly became the star of the Corrick performances after Alice left the tours in 1913.

=== Farewell New Zealand tour ===
Following Albert's death in March 1914, the family made a final tour of New Zealand. They were warmly welcomed by audiences, but were by now sharing the programme with various other performances. This 'farewell tour' lasted until July 1915, when the family, exhausted by years of almost continuous performance, decided to settle in Launceston, in Tasmania.

== Advertising ==
It was during the early New Zealand tours that Albert realised the power of advertising, and started to give audiences plenty of advance notice of their upcoming performances. Initially these were restrained and simply informative, but later became less modest. On tour in Australia, their advertising ranged from a beautifully crafted piece for a charity concert, to some unashamedly vaudevillian promotion.

== "Leonard's Beautiful Pictures" ==
Leonard Corrick developed an early interest in photography, and while he was still in his teens he convinced his father to purchase a magic lantern projector. By 1900 this was being used during family performances to provide a backdrop picture for certain songs, and proved popular with audiences.

In January 1901, encouraged by this success, the Corricks obtained an Edison projector and a small collection of moving films. Leonard, still aged just 14, maintained and operated this equipment, and the Corrick advertising was soon promoting "Leonard’s Beautiful Pictures" (also named "Leonard’s Bioscope Pictures" and "Leonard’s Biograph Company.")

By 1906, the Corricks had ordered a portable electricity generator to provide them with improved stage and projection lighting. This also allowed them to lure a larger audience in country towns, as they would shine bright lights into the night sky, attracting curious customers from surrounding areas.

During their travels, the Corricks would also make their own films. One of their earliest, filmed in March 1907 in Perth, Western Australia, was "Street Scenes in Perth"; this was shown during their performance the same evening, allowing amazed patrons to see themselves on film. A month later, they filmed a short comedy farce, "Bashful Mr. Brown", featuring family members as actors. While on their way back to Australia from Britain, aboard the SS Runic in 1909, they filmed "Sports and Play at Sea", again featuring themselves as well as other passengers and crew.

"The Day-Postle Match" became one of their most successful films, featuring a running contest between Australian sprint champion Arthur Postle and Irishman J.B Day, held in Kalgoorlie on 10 April 1907. When shown locally, Postle himself came to see it, and was invited onstage by the Corricks to address the audience. This film remained popular for some time.

After the family ceased touring, the Corrick film collection was held by Corrick descendants in Launceston for many years, until it was passed to the Australian National Film and Sound Archive, which undertook extensive preservation work on the collection. (Note: The Corrick films were all nitrate based, and as such had a limited storage life.)

== After the tours ==
Ethel was the first of the Corrick daughters to marry, falling in love with the family advance agent, Harold George Coulter. (Note: Much to the delight of Sarah, Coulter proposed to the auburn-haired Ethel by moonlight at the Taj Mahal in India, according to Elsie’s memoirs.) They married in November 1912, but Ethel continued to tour with the family, appearing under her maiden name. Harold and Ethel had two sons. After Harold's sudden death in 1919 from food poisoning, Ethel briefly became a confectioner, but then took up teaching and playing the violin. She died many years later in Launceston in June 1971.

In February 1913 Alice married Launceston businessman William Edward Sadleir, a land agent, in Bunbury, Western Australia. After a short holiday in Cottesloe in Perth, they departed the state to travel to Launceston, where they established their home. They raised three sons and a daughter. Edward Sadleir died in 1925, and Alice taught music and singing for many years. She formed a Ladies Choir and taught at the Broadland House School in Launceston. She died in Heidelberg in Victoria in 1956.

Albert suffered a heart attack in Western Australia in 1913, and had to substantially cut his touring involvement. He died in Launceston in March 1914. Sarah outlived him by many years, and set up a large communal home for herself and several of her children in St. John Street in Launceston. Sarah died in December 1935.

Leonard married Violet Mary Campbell in Victoria in 1918. They settled in Launceston and raised two sons and three daughters. Along with some of his sisters, he played in theatre orchestras in Launceston. He established a car business, but after this was unsuccessful he turned to playing in the ABC Military band, and moved to Sydney to live. Violet died in Launceston in 1962, and Leonard in New South Wales in 1967.

Ruby married Henry Cottrell Webb in Queensland in February 1920. They settled there, raising a son and a daughter. Ruby died in 1948.

Elsie married Stanley Victor Tilley in Launceston in 1922. They raised four sons and two daughters. Elsie taught piano, violin and elocution at the Corrick School of Music in Launceston, and founded the Tasmania Music Festival Society in 1942. She died in Launceston in 1974 and Stanley in 1985.

Gertie, Amy and Jessie never married. Gertie was the de facto manager of the family and along with Amy, Ethel and Leonard was active in theatre orchestras in Launceston. She and Elsie also regularly played church organs. Amy was a well-regarded flautist, and was retained by J. C. Williamson's for tours of Western Australia for some years. Gertie and Amy died in Launceston, in 1945 and 1968 respectively, and Jessie in Hobart in 1957.

Most of the family, and several of their children, are buried in a family plot in Launceston's Carr Villa cemetery.
