= Anthony van Diemen =

Dutch colonial governor (1593–1645)

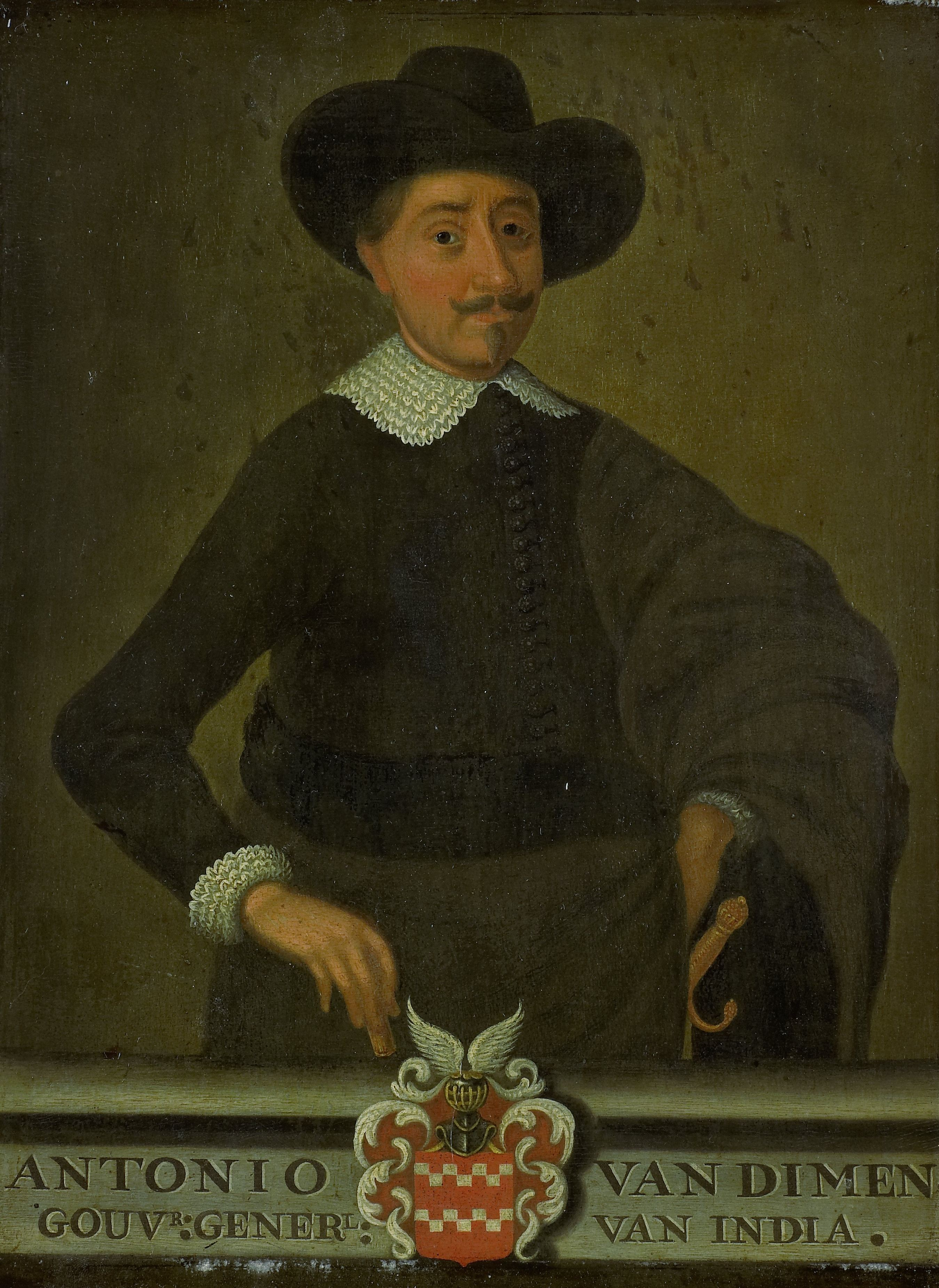
- Portrait of Anthony van Diemen

Governor-General of the Dutch East Indies
- In office 1636–1645
- Preceded by: Hendrik Brouwer
- Succeeded by: Cornelis van der Lijn

Personal details
- Born: 1593 Culemborg, County of Culemborg, Holy Roman Empire
- Died: 19 April 1645 (aged 51–52) Batavia, Dutch East India
- Occupation: Explorer, colonial governor

Anthony van Diemen (also Antonie, Antonio, Anton, Antonius; 1593 – 19 April 1645) was a Dutch colonial governor.

== Early life ==
Van Diemen was born in Culemborg (now in the Netherlands, then in a county in the Holy Roman Empire), the son of Meeus Anthonisz van Diemen and Christina Hoevenaar. In 1616, he moved to Amsterdam, in hope of improving his fortune as a merchant; in this he failed and was declared bankrupt. After a year he became a servant of the Dutch East India Company and sailed to Batavia, Dutch East Indies (Jakarta), capital of the Dutch East Indies. On the voyage out, the East Indiaman Mauritius inadvertently put in on unknown coast of Australia.

== Career ==
Governor Jan Pieterszoon Coen found van Diemen to be a talented official and by 1626 he was Director-General of Commerce and member of the Council for the Indies. In 1630, he married Maria van Aelst. A year later he returned to the Netherlands as Admiral on the ship Deventer.

While on route to the Indies in 1633, Van Diemen sighted and named Amsterdam Island, after his vessel at the time, Nieuw Amsterdam.

In 1635, he was appointed Governor-General of the Dutch East Indies, his appointment taking effect on 1 January 1636. Van Diemen's nine years as Governor-General were successful and important for both the colony and the commercial success of the Dutch East India Company. He devoted much of his energy to expanding the power of the company throughout South-East Asia. Under his rule Dutch power was established in Ceylon (now Sri Lanka) via Trincomalee.

== Discovery of Tasmania ==
Van Diemen is best remembered for his efforts to foster exploration of the "Great South Land" (Australia), resulting in "the final and most ambitious Dutch voyages of the century". The first voyage under his energetic administration was undertaken within three months of his arrival in Batavia; starting from Cape York its ships were to chart the unknown coasts, but the venture ended in failure, when its commander was killed by natives in New Guinea, and the ships returned.

In 1639, he commissioned two voyages to the north, in search of the "Gold and Silver Islands" that Spanish reports placed in the North Pacific to the east of Japan, and sent Maarten Gerritsz Vries to explore the coasts of Korea and "Tartaria"; these, too, returned fruitlessly. Undeterred, Van Diemen appointed Frans Visscher to draw up a plan for new discoveries. Visscher mapped out three different routes and van Diemen decided in August 1642 to send Abel Janszoon Tasman, accompanied by Visscher, in search of the Great South Land, which Tasman would soon dub "Nieuw Holland".

In November 1642, heading east from Mauritius on latitude 44 and missing the south coast of the Australian continent, Tasman sighted land at what is now the west coast of the island of Tasmania, and followed the coastline along the southern shore and around to the east coast. Tasman sent a party ashore at Blackman Bay, on the Tasman Peninsula, who planted a flag and encountered a few Tasmanian people. Believing he had found a large territory, Tasman named it Van Diemen's Land in honour of his patron.

== Legacy ==
Van Diemen is also commemorated in Van Diemen Gulf on the coast of northern Australia. He commissioned a further voyage from Tasman in 1644. Van Diemen died in 1645 in Batavia, Dutch East Indies. The company granted his wife a large pension and she retired to the Netherlands.

Her name is perpetuated in the name of the westernmost point of the North Island of New Zealand, Cape Maria van Diemen, named by Tasman in 1643, and by Maria Island off the east coast of Tasmania. It is one of only two geographical locations in New Zealand to have the name Tasman gave them, the other being Three Kings Islands.

Van Diemen also gives his name to Fort Antonio in modern-day Tamsui at the mouth of the Tamsui River in northern Taipei, Taiwan, which was built by the Dutch on the site of an abandoned Spanish fort in an historical area now known as the Fort Santo Domingo museum complex, the name of which causes ongoing confusion about the actual name of the main fort building along with its Dutch origins.

In 1842, the venomous Australian and southern Papuan, elapid Whip Snake genus Demansia was named in honour of van Diemen by J. E. Gray of the British Museum in London.
