= Peerapper language =

Extinct Western Tasmanian language of Australia

Peerapper
- Northwestern Tasmanian
- Region: North-western coast of Tasmania
- Ethnicity: Northwestern tribe of Tasmanians
- Extinct: 19th century
- Language family: Northern–Western Tasmanian?: Western Tasmanian; Peerapper
- Dialects: West Point?

Language codes
- ISO 639-3: xpw
- Glottolog: nort3415
- AIATSIS: T3 North-western (Tasmania), T6 Macquarie Harbour, T11 Robbins Island, T12 Circular Head

Northwestern Tasmanian, or Peerapper (also Peewrapper or "Pirapa"), is an Aboriginal language of Tasmania in the reconstruction of Claire Bowern. It was spoken along the west coast of the island, from Macquarie Harbour north to Circular Head and Robbins Island.

== History ==
=== Documentation ===
Northwestern Tasmanian is poorly attested, known from four word lists: The "west coast" vocabularies of Charles Robinson and George Augustus Robinson, with 246 words combined; the Robbins Island list of George Augustus Robinson, with 162 words; and the Macquarie Harbour vocabularies of Allan Cunningham (222 words), collected on 25 January 1819 and later republished by Phillip Parker King in 1826.

The list collected by George Augustus Robinson at West Point ("Western Tribes") is divergent, and is classified as a separate language by Bowern. However, it includes only 28 words, so little can be definitively said.
