= Heemskerck (1638 ship) =

Abel Tasman's Flagship

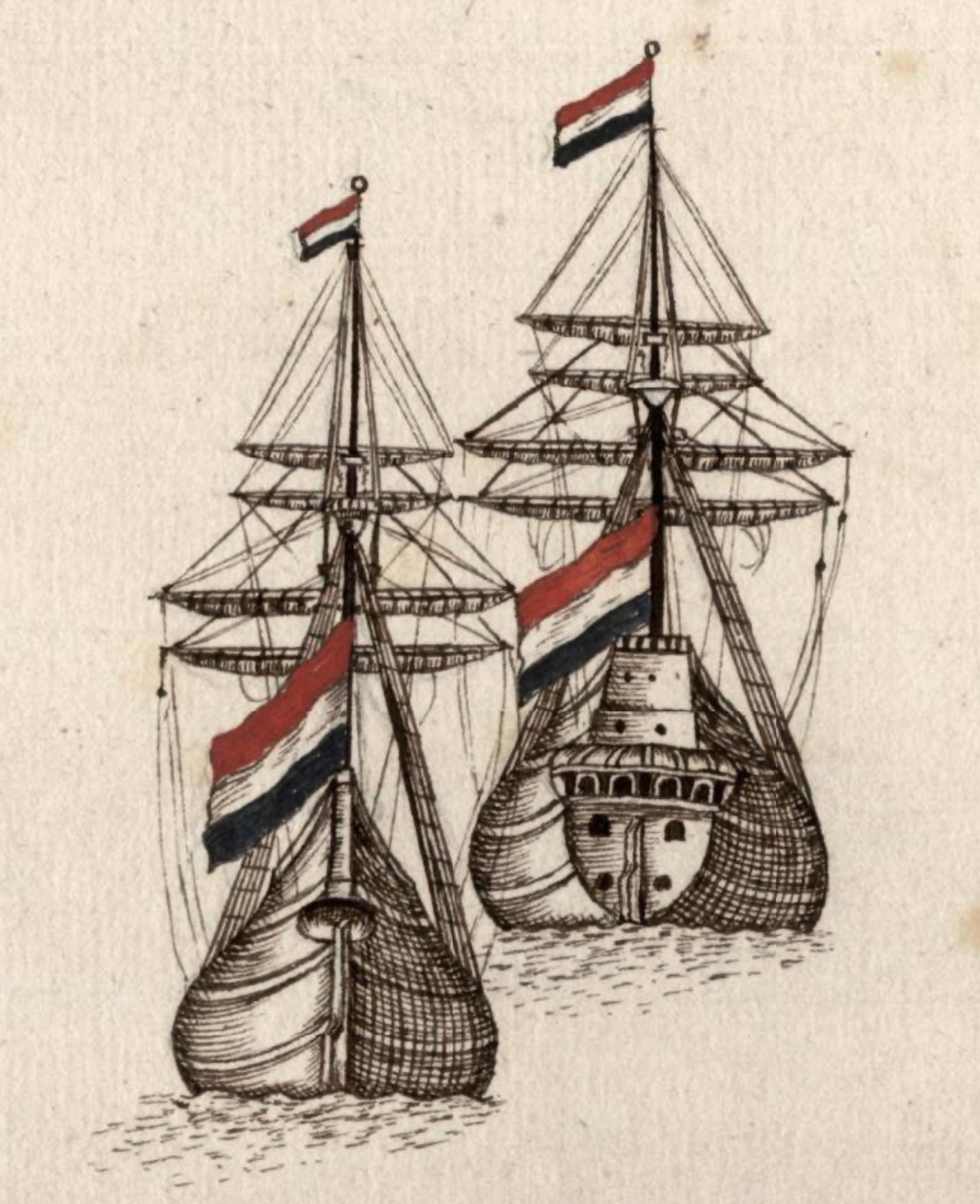
- Stern view of Heemskerck, right, and Zeehaen, as sketched in Abel Tasman's journal

History

Netherlands
- Name: Heemskerck
- Namesake: Jacob van Heemskerck
- Builder: Dutch East India Company
- Launched: 1638
- Fate: Broken up in 1649

General characteristics
- Class & type: Small war yacht
- Tons burthen: 120
- Length: 106 feet (32 m)
- Beam: 24 ft (7.3 m)
- Draft: 9 ft (2.7 m)
- Complement: 60 officers and men

Heemskerck [ɦeːmsˈkɛrk] was the flagship of Abel Janszoon Tasman's exploratory voyage of 1642. She and her consort Zeehaen ([ˈzeːɦaːn]; lit. 'sea-cock', a fluyt) were the first European ships to explore the south coast of Australia, including Tasmania, cross the Tasman Sea, and reach New Zealand among other achievements.

== Construction and characteristics ==
Heemskerck was built by the Dutch East India Company, known as the "VOC" in its Dutch abbreviation. She was launched in 1638.

There are no contemporary detailed descriptions of Heemskerck. Tasman's journal includes a few simple sketches by artist Isaac Gilsemans, who accompanied the voyage, and a handful of written details about the ship's characteristics, but much of the ship's design must be inferred from the standards promulgated by the VOC to its shipbuilders, and information on other ships of her type. Since every ship of this era was hand-built and subject to ad hoc repairs in distant ports, there is no assurance that Heemskerck complied with VOC standards.

In a resolution dated 17 September 1637, the VOC instructed its shipwrights that a "small war yacht" was to be 106 feet (32 m) long, 24 feet (7.3 m) in beam, and draw 9 feet (2.7 m). These measurements are subject to ambiguity because a "foot" was not a standard measure in the Netherlands at the time. An Amsterdam foot was about 11 inches (28 cm) while other "feet" had other lengths. A small war yacht's hull was to have a capacity of 60 "lasts". A last was certainly a measure of cargo carrying capacity, but in various times and places it referred to the volume of cargo a ship could carry, and in others the weight of cargo a ship could carry. As a measure of volume, 60 lasts was approximately 120 tons burthen.

Heemskerck was designated by the VOC as a "small war yacht", but it is unclear if she was built to the specifications of the 1637 resolution. In any case, her hull and masts were certainly made of wood. As in other war yachts, her transom was a squared-off vertical face. This sacrificed some cargo capacity but made possible the mounting of guns, "stern chasers", pointed directly aft. In one of Gilsemans' drawings, three vertical Xs are shown on the upper part of the transom. It is likely that the ship had some form of the coat of arms of Amsterdam displayed on her stern.

It is uncertain what armament Heemskerck carried, but it certainly included cannon. She carried her guns on two decks, as one of Gilsemans' sketches shows. Tasman's journal mentions guns on the "upper orlop" deck, in the "gun room", and on the "upper deck". The journal also mentions firing "bow guns", suggesting the presence of at least two bow chasers. One of Gilsemans' illustrations in Tasman's journal clearly shows two stern chasers.

The sketches of Heemskerck in Tasman's journal show three masts and a bowsprit, a rigging configuration that was the norm for Dutch ships of this type. Both the foremast and mainmast supported two square-rigged sails. The mizzen mast had a single lateen sail. The bowsprit supported a spritsail.

The resolution of Governor-General Van Dieman and his council, dated 1 August 1642, which set Tasman's first exploratory voyage in motion, specified that Heemskerck would sail with a crew of 60 officers and men. It is unknown how many were actually aboard for the voyage.

The ship was likely named after Dutch explorer and admiral Jacob van Heemskreck.

== History ==
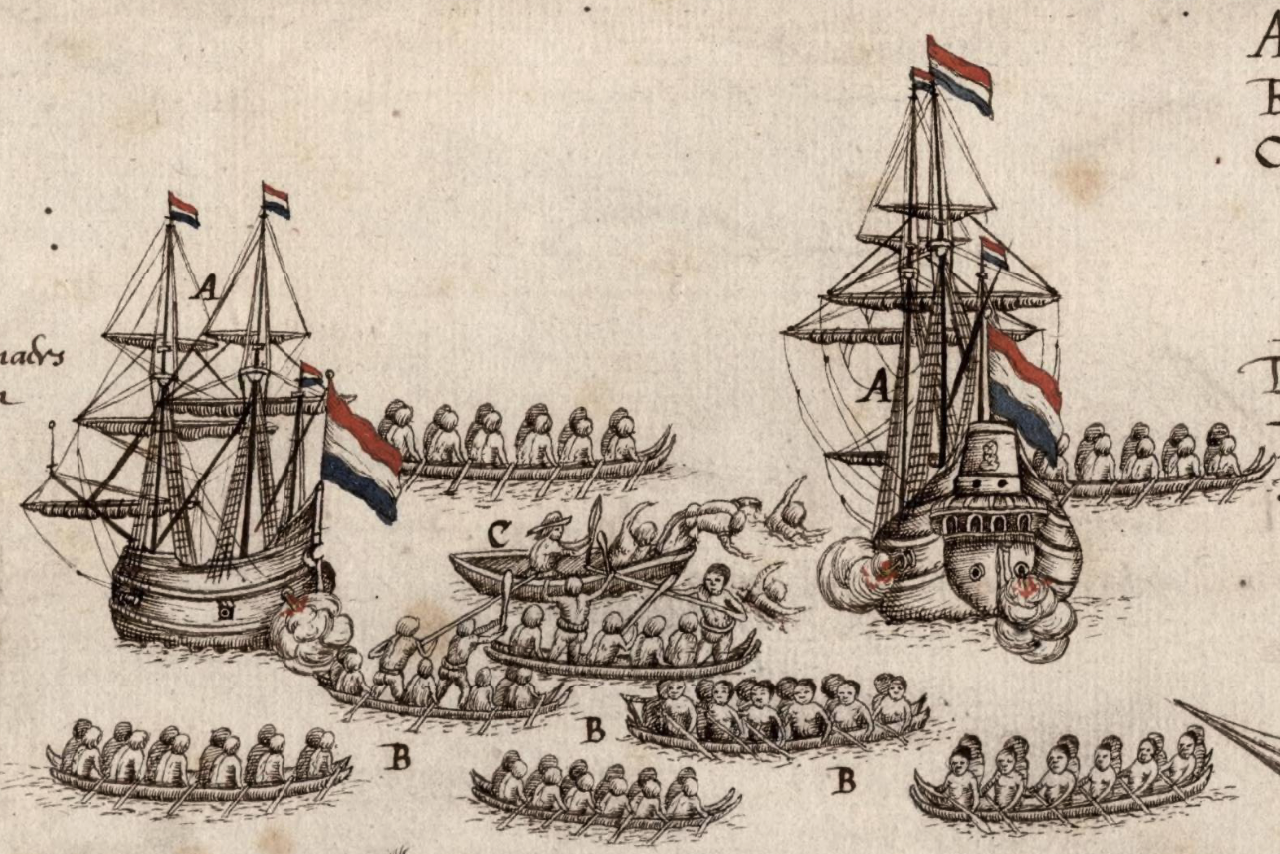
Heemskerck, right, and Zeehaen fighting with the Maori at Golden Bay, New Zealand. This is a portion of a sketch from Abel Tasman's Journal.

On 29 April 1639 Heemskerck sailed from Texel in the Netherlands for Batavia. She reached Table Bay, near the Cape of Good Hope, on 11 September 1639. Here she replenished her food and water supplies. The ship finally reached Batavia on 22 November 1639. She never returned to Europe, and spent the rest of her career supporting VOC trade around Batavia as both a warship and cargo carrier. In 1640, she transported 63,679 pounds of cloves. Later that year, she was assigned to a six-war yacht fleet.

On 14 August 1642 Heemskerck sailed from Batavia with Tasman aboard as the commander of the two-ship expedition. The ships sailed to Mauritius where they underwent two months of repairs and provisioning, finally sailing again on 8 October 1642. On 24 November 1642 the ship reached the west coast of what is now Tasmania, the first European discovery of this land. After some quick explorations of the Tasmanian coast, Heemskerck and Zeehaen crossed what is now the Tasman Sea. They reached the South Island of New Zealand on 13 December 1642, once again, the first European ships to do so. Tasman directed the ships north along the New Zealand coast and then north beyond it where they became the first westerners to visit three of the islands now part of Tonga. The ships left Tonga on 1 February 1643. Sailing along the north coast of New Guinea, Heemskerck arrived back in Batavia on 15 June 1643.

In 1644, after Tasman's voyage, she was assigned to convoy duty. In 1648 the ship was damaged in a storm and had difficulty returning to Batavia. The next year, 1649, she was broken up.
