= Zeehan mineral field =

Mining area in Western Tasmania, Australia

Zeehan mineral field is a mining area near Zeehan in Western Tasmania, Australia.

The field is frequently associated with the short lived shallow silver deposits in the field, which peaked in the 1890s and early 1900s, and had faded by the time of the First World War.

The field has a complex set of orebodies and minerals, and continues to be explored to the present.

It is surrounded by long term mined and well searched areas – the Dundas and North-East Dundas fields to the east, and the North and South Heemskirk fields to the west.

Trams, smelters and concentrating mills were spread throughout the field over the 1890s and early 1900s.

== See also ==
- Geology of Tasmania
- Railways on the West Coast of Tasmania
- West Coast Tasmania Mines
