= Results of the 1914 Tasmanian local elections =

- 23 April 1914

This is a list of local government area results for the 1914 Tasmanian local elections.

== Burnie ==
1914 Burnie Municipal Council election
- 23 April 1914

Half Holiday
- 23 April 1914

Results
Choice	Votes	%
Saturday	215	68.04%
Thursday	84	26.58%
Other	17	5.38%
Valid votes	316	100.00%
Invalid or blank votes	0	0.00%
Total votes	316	100.00%

All candidates were elected unopposed. A proposition was put to the ratepayers, following a similar proposition in March 1912 which also overwhelmingly decided on Saturday, to again ask which day of the week upon which the half holiday would take place. The poll was prompted by 125 voter signatories to a requisition.

Choice	Votes	%
Saturday	215	68.04
Thursday	84	26.58
Other	17	5.38
Total	316	100.00
Valid votes	316	100.00
Invalid/blank votes	0	0.00
Total votes	316	100.00
Registered voters/turnout		–
Source: Examiner (1914)

== Circular Head ==
1914 Circular Head Municipal Council election
- 23 April 1914

=== Circular Heads results ===
1914 Tasmanian local elections: Stanley Ward
Party	Candidate	Votes	%	±%
Independent	M. Button	104	60.12	
Independent	Charles Collett Smith	69	39.88	
Total formal votes		173		
Informal votes				
Turnout				

== Deloraine ==
1914 Deloraine Municipal Council election
- 23 April 1914

Meander Ward elects two councillors.

=== Deloraine results ===
1914 Tasmanian local elections: Central Ward
Party	Candidate	Votes	%	±%
Independent	Learoyd	212	75.71	
Independent	King	68	24.29	
Total formal votes		280		
Informal votes				
Turnout				

1914 Tasmanian local elections: Meander Ward
Party	Candidate	Votes	%	±%
Independent	Harris (elected)	115	45.63	
Independent	Smith (elected)	90	35.71	
Independent	Hall	47	18.65	
Total formal votes		252		
Informal votes				
Turnout				

== Devonport ==
1914 Devonport Municipal Council election
- 23 April 1914

South Ward incumbent councillor A. G. B. Keene did not seek re-election. Central Ward candidate John Luck was a former warden.

=== Devonport results ===
1914 Tasmanian local elections: South Ward
Party	Candidate	Votes	%	±%
Independent	W. Jeffries	140	72.54	
Independent	H. Lane	53	27.46	
Total formal votes		193		
Informal votes				
Turnout				
W. Jeffries gain from A. G. B. Keene				

1914 Tasmanian local elections: Central Ward
Party	Candidate	Votes	%	±%
Independent	W. Curwen	115	53.49	
Independent	John Luck	100	46.51	
Total formal votes		215		
Informal votes				
Turnout				
W. Curwen hold				

== Latrobe ==
1914 Latrobe Municipal Council election
- 23 April 1914

Half Holiday
- 23 April 1914

Results
Choice	Votes	%
Wednesday	178	59.93%
Saturday	98	33.00%
Thursday	21	7.07%

M. Nicholls, who was re-elected to Harford Ward unopposed was Warden.

=== Latrobe plebiscite ===
Choice	Votes	%
Wednesday	178	59.93
Saturday	98	33.00
Thursday	21	7.07
Total	297	100.00
Valid votes	297	100.00
Invalid/blank votes	0	0.00
Total votes	297	100.00
Registered voters/turnout		–
Source: Examiner (1914)

=== Latrobe results ===
1914 Tasmanian local elections: Sherwood Ward
Party	Candidate	Votes	%	±%
Independent	A. Boatwright	147	54.04	
Independent	Thos. Teasdale	62	22.79	
Independent	D. Aldred	60	22.06	
Independent	S. Southern	3	1.10	
Total formal votes		272		
Informal votes		16		
Turnout		288		

1914 Tasmanian local elections: Sassafras Ward
Party	Candidate	Votes	%	±%
Independent	W. A. Reynolds	104	52.26	
Independent	T. H. Outts	95	47.74	
Total formal votes		199		
Informal votes				
Turnout				

1914 Tasmanian local elections: Harford Ward
Party	Candidate	Votes	%	±%
Independent	M. Nicholls (elected unopposed)			
Total formal votes				
Informal votes				
Turnout				

== Longford ==
1914 Longford Municipal Council election
- 23 April 1914

Only one ward held an election.

=== Longford results ===
1914 Tasmanian local elections: St Helen's Ward
Party	Candidate	Votes	%	±%
Independent	T. C. Archer	191	60.25	
Independent	A. G. Stokes	126	39.75	
Total formal votes		317	99.37	
Informal votes		2	0.63	
Turnout		319		

== Penguin ==
1914 Penguin Municipal Council election
- 23 April 1914

The following results are missing the counts from Gunn's Plains, Upper Blythe, and Ellenton, however they would not have changed the results.

=== Penguin results ===
1914 Tasmanian local elections: Penguin
Party	Candidate	Votes	%	±%
Independent	James Bennett	142		
Independent	Cr. Smith	81		
Total formal votes		223		
Informal votes				
Turnout				
James Bennett gain from Cr. Smith				

== Portland ==
1914 Portland Municipal Council election
- 23 April 1914

Bush Nursing Scheme
- 23 April 1914
- "Are you in favor of the Council employing a nurse for the municipality?"

Elections took place for all three wards.

1914 Tasmanian local elections: St Helen's Ward
Party	Candidate	Votes	%	±%
Independent	John William Treloggen	108	55.96	
Independent	William Thompson	85	44.04	
Total formal votes		193		
Informal votes				
Turnout				

1914 Tasmanian local elections: Lottah Ward
Party	Candidate	Votes	%	±%
Independent	George H. Hodgman	107	50.71	
Independent	Chas. H. E. White	104	49.29	
Total formal votes		211		
Informal votes				
Turnout				

1914 Tasmanian local elections: Gould's Country Ward
Party	Candidate	Votes	%	±%
Independent	John Mcauliff	94	56.63	
Independent	John McCracken	72	43.37	
Total formal votes		166		
Informal votes				
Turnout				

== Ringarooma ==
1914 Ringarooma Municipal Council election
- 23 April 1914

Four of the five wards held elections. The Municipality of Ringarooma had a rather unique voting method in which ratepayers could vote at any polling booth and for whichever ward they wished.

=== Ringarooma results ===
1914 Tasmanian local elections: Derby Ward
Party	Candidate	Votes	%	±%
Independent	M. Grace	159	51.62	
Independent	W. A. Scott	149	48.38	
Total formal votes		308		
Informal votes				
Turnout				

1914 Tasmanian local elections: Gladstone Ward
Party	Candidate	Votes	%	±%
Independent	C. G. Ryan	132	55.23	
Independent	T. Pitchford	107	44.77	
Total formal votes		239	98.76	
Informal votes		3	1.24	
Turnout		242		

1914 Tasmanian local elections: Legerwood Ward
Party	Candidate	Votes	%	±%
Independent	S. F. O. Diprose	117	71.78	
Independent	M. G. Holmes	46	28.22	
Total formal votes		163		
Informal votes				
Turnout				

1914 Tasmanian local elections: Moorina Ward
Party	Candidate	Votes	%	±%
Independent	A. A. Collins	142	59.17	
Independent	W. T. Tucker	98	40.83	
Total formal votes		240		
Informal votes				
Turnout				

== Scottsdale ==
1914 Scottsdale Municipal Council election
- 23 April 1914

Public Hall
- 23 April 1914
- Proposal to borrow £1500 to erect a new hall conditionally on the Mechanics' Institute being handed over to the Council

Results
Choice	Votes	%
For	206	53.23%
Against	181	46.77%
Valid votes	387	96.03%
Invalid or blank votes	16	3.97%
Total votes	403	100.00%

Half Holiday
- 23 April 1914

Results
Choice	Votes	%
Saturday	112	57.14%
Wednesday	84	42.86%
Valid votes	196	89.09%
Invalid or blank votes	24	10.91%
Total votes	220	100.00%

Only one ward held a councillor election, with two wards electing their candidates unopposed. Two propositions we put to the ratepayers.

=== Scottsdale plebiscites ===
There are conflicting sources on the results of the Public Hall plebiscite.

Choice	Votes	%
For	206	53.23
Against	181	46.77
Total	387	100.00
Valid votes	387	96.03
Invalid/blank votes	16	3.97
Total votes	403	100.00
Source: North-Eastern Advertiser

Choice	Votes	%
For	196	91.59
Against	18	8.41
Total	214	100.00
Source: Examiner

Choice	Votes	%
Saturday	112	57.14
Wednesday	84	42.86
Total	196	100.00
Valid votes	196	89.09
Invalid/blank votes	24	10.91
Total votes	220	100.00
Source: North-Eastern Advertiser

=== Scottsdale results ===
1914 Tasmanian local elections: Jetsonville Ward
Party	Candidate	Votes	%	±%
Independent	Robt Coplestone (elected unopposed)			
Total formal votes				
Informal votes				
Turnout				

1914 Tasmanian local elections: Springfield Ward
Party	Candidate	Votes	%	±%
Independent	C. H. Hookway (elected unopposed)			
Total formal votes				
Informal votes				
Turnout				

1914 Tasmanian local elections: Town Ward
Party	Candidate	Votes	%	±%
Independent	Wm. Ernest Rose	111	49.55	
Independent	Samuel Hawkes	64	28.57	
Independent	Joseph Cavanaugh	49	21.88	
Total formal votes		224	98.68	
Informal votes		3	1.32	
Turnout		227		
Wm. Ernerst Rose hold				

== St. Leonards ==
1914 St. Leonards Municipal Council election
- 23 April 1914

Only one ward held elections. Results were slow and thus unavailable in the source due to long distance between polling places and the council seat.

=== St. Leonards results ===
1914 Tasmanian local elections: North Esk Ward
Party	Candidate	Votes	%	±%
Independent	Cr W. J. Connell			
Independent	Robert Stevenson			
Total formal votes				
Informal votes				
Turnout				

1914 Tasmanian local elections: Breadalbane Ward
Party	Candidate	Votes	%	±%
Independent	A. J. Machen (elected unopposed)			
Total formal votes				
Informal votes				
Turnout				
A. J. Machen hold				

1914 Tasmanian local elections: Patersonia Ward
Party	Candidate	Votes	%	±%
Independent	Thos. Owen (elected unopposed)			
Total formal votes				
Informal votes				
Turnout				

== Table Cape ==
1914 Table Cape Municipal Council election
- 23 April 1914

=== Table Cape results ===
1914 Tasmanian local elections: Wynward Ward
Party	Candidate	Votes	%	±%
Independent	W. J. Alderson	222	57.81	
Independent	M. Dowling	154	40.10	
Independent	R. W. Stewart	8	2.08	
Total formal votes		384		
Informal votes				
Turnout				

== Zeehan ==
1914 Zeehan Municipal Council election
- 23 April 1914

3 seats on Zeehan Municipal Council

Only West Ward held a vote, with Cr. Geard being re-elected.

=== Zeehan results ===
1914 Tasmanian local elections: West Ward
Party	Candidate	Votes	%	±%
Independent	W. S. Geard	187	52.09	
Independent	Charles Murphy	172	47.91	+0.5
Total formal votes		359	98.63	
Informal votes		5	1.37	
Turnout		364		
W. S. Geard hold		Swing		

1914 Tasmanian local elections: Montague Ward
Party	Candidate	Votes	%	±%
Independent	G. Dunkley (elected unopposed)			
Total formal votes				
Informal votes				
Turnout				

1914 Tasmanian local elections: East Ward
Party	Candidate	Votes	%	±%
Independent	F. Wathen (elected unopposed)			
Total formal votes				
Informal votes				
Turnout				
