= Former local government areas of Tasmania =

Former local government authorities of Tasmania

Map of Local Government Areas in 1907 under the Local Government Act 1906.

Former Local government areas (LGAs) in the Australian state of Tasmania are amalgamated or cancelled areas.

Tasmania has had a large number of former LGAs.

In 1907, 149 LGAs were reduced by mergers and amalgamation to 53 LGAs. By the time of a large scale overhaul in 1993, 46 LGAs were reduced to 29 LGAs.

== List of Former Local Government Areas ==
The list below is incomplete:

Local government area	Seat of council	Date established	Date abolished	Amalgamated into	Now a part of	Type	Notes	Ref
Municipality of Beaconsfield	Beaconsfield	19 Aug 1907	2 Apr 1907	NA	West Tamar	Municipality	Renamed West Tamar with amended boundaries 2 Apr 1993.	
Municipality of Bothwell	Bothwell	1 Jan 1862	2 Apr 1993	Central Highlands	Central Highlands	Municipality	Amalgamated with Hamilton to create Central Highlands	
Municipality of Bruni		19 Aug 1907	2 Apr 1993	Kingborough Council	Kingborough Council	Municipality	Covered all of Bruni Island (now spelt Bruny).	
Municipality of Campbell Town	Campbell Town	6 Aug 1866	2 Apr 1993	Northern Midlands Council	Northern Midlands Council	Municipality		
Municipality of Deloraine	Deloraine	2 Nov 1863	2 Apr 1993	Meander Valley Council	Meander Valley Council	Municipality		
Municipality of Esperance		19 Aug 1907	2 Apr 1993	Huon Valley Council	Huon Valley Council	Municipality		
Municipality of Evandale	Evandale	1 Jan 1865	2 Apr 1993	Northern Midlands Council	Northern Midlands Council; City of Launceston	Municipality	Part amalgamated with Campbell Town, Fingal (part), Longford and Ross to create Northern Midlands and part absorbed by Launceston.	
Municipality of Fingal	Fingal	5 Jan 1863	2 Apr 1993	Portland-Fingal; Northern Midlands Council	Break O'Day Council; Northern Midlands Council	Municipality	Part amalgamated with Portland to create Portland-Fingal (subsequently renamed Break O'Day), and remainder amalgamated with Campbell Town, Evandale, Longford and Ross to create Northern Midlands.	
Municipality of Glamorgan	Swansea	23 Jan 1860	2 Apr 1993	Glamorgan–Spring Bay Council	Glamorgan–Spring Bay Council	Municipality		
Municipality of Gormanston	Gormanston	19 Aug 1907	31 Dec 1986	Lyell Municipal Council	West Coast Council	Municipality		
Municipality of Green Ponds	Green Ponds	7 Mar 1862	2 Apr 1993	Southern Midlands Council	Southern Midlands Council	Municipality		
Municipality of Hamilton	Hamilton	24 Aug 1863	2 Apr 1993	Central Highlands Council	Central Highlands Council	Municipality	Amalgamated with Bothwell to create Central Highlands	
Municipality of Huon		19 Aug 1907	2 Apr 1993	Huon Valley Council	Huon Valley Council	Municipality	Amalgamated with Esperance and Port Cygnet to create Huon Valley	
Municipality of Lilydale	Lilydale	19 Aug 1907	31 Dec 1985	City of Launceston	City of Launceston	Municipality		
Municipality of Longford	Longford	27 Jan 1862	2 Apr 1993	Northern Midlands Council	Northern Midlands Council	Municipality		
Municipality of Lyell	Queenstown	31 Dec 1986	2 Apr 1993	West Coast Council	West Coast Council	Municipality		
Municipality of Oatlands	Oatlands	29 Nov 1861	2 Apr 1993	Southern Midlands Council	Southern Midlands Council	Municipality		
Municipality of Penguin	Penguin	19 Aug 1907	2 Apr 1993	Central Coast Council	Central Coast Council	Municipality		
Municipality of Port Cygnet	Cygnet	19 Aug 1907	2 Apr 1993	Huon Valley Council	Huon Valley Council	Municipality		
Municipality of Portland	Portland	19 Aug 1907	2 Apr 1993	Portland-Fingal	Break O'Day Council	Municipality		
Municipality of Queenborough		19 Aug 1907	31 Dec 1919	City of Hobart	City of Hobart	Municipality		
Municipality of Queenstown	Queenstown	19 Aug 1907	31 Dec 1986	Lyell Municipal Council	West Coast Council	Municipality		
Municipality of Richmond	Richmond	26 May 1862	2 Apr 1993	City of Clarence Southern Midlands Council	City of Clarence	Municipality	Part amalgamated with Brighton (part), Green Ponds and Oatlands to create Southern Midlands, and part absorbed by Clarence	
Municipality of Ringarooma	Ringarooma	19 Aug 1907	2 Apr 1993	Dorset Council	Dorset Council	Municipality		
Municipality of Ross		26 Dec 1862	2 Apr 1993	Northern Midlands Council	Northern Midlands Council	Municipality		
Municipality of Scottsdale	Scottsdale	19 Aug 1907	2 Apr 1993	Dorset Council	Dorset Council	Municipality		
Municipality of St Leonards	St Leonards	19 Aug 1907	31 Dec 1985	City of Launceston	City of Launceston	Municipality		
Municipality of Spring Bay	Triabunna	10 Sep 1860	2 Apr 1993	Glamorgan–Spring Bay Council	Glamorgan–Spring Bay Council	Municipality		
Municipality of Strahan	Strahan	19 Aug 1907	2 Apr 1993	West Coast Council	West Coast Council	Municipality		
Municipality of Ulverstone	Ulverstone	19 Aug 1907 (as Leven)	2 Apr 1993	Central Coast Council	Central Coast Council	Municipality	(formerly Municipality of Leven)	
Municipality of Waratah	Waratah	19 Aug 1907	2 Apr 1993	Waratah-Wynyard Council	Waratah-Wynyard Council	Municipality		
Municipality of Wynyard	Wynyard	19 Aug 1907	2 Apr 1993	Waratah-Wynyard Council	Waratah-Wynyard Council	Municipality	Called Table Cape until 18 Oct 1945	
Municipality of Westbury	Westbury	2 Nov 1863	2 Apr 1993	Meander Valley Council	Meander Valley Council	Municipality		
Municipality of Zeehan	Zeehan	19 Aug 1907	2 Apr 1993	West Coast Council	West Coast Council	Municipality		

=== Renamed Local Government Areas ===
The list below is incomplete:

Starting name	Seat of council	Starting name since	Date name changed	Renamed to	Now a part of	Notes	Ref
Municipality of Emu Bay	Burnie	6 Jan 1908	22 Dec 1931	Municipality of Burnie	City of Burnie	Name of the municipality was changed from Emu Bay to Burnie (the principal town) following a petition from residents. Burnie became a city in 1988.	
Municipality of New Norfolk	New Norfolk	17 Mar 1863	2 Apr 1994	Derwent Valley Council	Derwent Valley Council		
Municipality of Burnie	Burnie	22 Dec 1931	26 Apr 1988	City of Burnie	City of Burnie	Elevated to city.	
Portland-Fingal	St Helens	2 Apr 1993	?	Break O'Day Council	Break O'Day Council	Name change	

== See also ==
- List of localities in Tasmania
- Local government areas of Tasmania
- Divisions of the Australian House of Representatives#Tasmania
