= Results of the 1917 Tasmanian local elections =

1917 Tasmanian Local Elections
- 26 April 1917

== Gormanston ==
1917 Gormanston Municipal Council Election
- 26 April 1917

Owen ward was contested by two newcomers which resulted in a very close result and only one vote between the candidates. In Lyell Ward, incumbent councillor M. Kean was challenged and beaten out by W. Hine. Incumbend Linda Ward councillor T. Kelly was returned unopposed.

1917 Tasmanian local elections: Owen Ward
Party	Candidate	Votes	%	±%
Independent	W. Williams	82	50.3	
Independent	E. Skillern	81	49.7	
Total formal votes		163		
Informal votes				
Turnout				
W. Williams gain from				

1917 Tasmanian local elections: Lyell Ward
Party	Candidate	Votes	%	±%
Independent	W. Hine	33	75	
Independent	M. Kean	11	25	
Total formal votes		44		
Informal votes				
Turnout				
W. Hine gain from M. Kean				

1917 Tasmanian local elections: Linda Ward
Party	Candidate	Votes	%	±%
Independent	T. Kelly (elected unopposed)	—	—	—
Total formal votes		—	—	—
Informal votes		—	—	—
Turnout		—	0	—
T. Kelly hold				

== Queenstown ==
1917 Queenstown Municipal Council Election
- 26 April 1917

Incumbent North Ward councillor G. B. Phillips was beaten out by W. G. Bradshaw by a quite large margin. The incumbent councillors for Central Ward, Andrew Lawson, and South Ward, T. H. Gilbert, were both returned. The prior unopposed and the latter by an overwhelming majority.

1917 Tasmanian local elections: North Ward
Party	Candidate	Votes	%	±%
Independent	W. G. Bradshaw	123	63.4	
Independent	G. B. Phillips	68	35.1	
Independent	J. J. Campbell	3	1.5	
Total formal votes		194	98.5	
Informal votes		3	1.5	
Turnout		197		
W. Bradshaw gain from G. Phillips				

1917 Tasmanian local elections: Central Ward
Party	Candidate	Votes	%	±%
Independent	Andrew Lawson (elected unopposed)	—	—	—
Total formal votes		—	—	—
Informal votes		—	—	—
Turnout		—	0	—
Andrew Lawson hold				

1917 Tasmanian local elections: South Ward
Party	Candidate	Votes	%	±%
Independent	T. H. Gilbert	168	78.5	
Independent	D. Murphy	46	21.5	
Total formal votes		214		
Informal votes				
Turnout				
T. H. Gilbert hold				

== Zeehan ==
1917 Zeehan Municipal Council Election
- 26 April 1917

3 (of the 9) seats on the Zeehan Municipal Council
- Turnout: 1,300

In both East Ward and Montagu Ward the incumbent councillors retained their seats comfortably following their unopposed victories at the last election. The West Ward incumbent councillor W. S. Geard did not recontest his seat, resulting in a relatively close result between the two newcomers.

1917 Tasmanian local elections: East Ward
Party	Candidate	Votes	%	±%
Independent	F. W. Wathen	351	70.9	+70.9 (Note: no contest held last election)
Independent	E. J. McCarthy	144	29.1	
Total formal votes		495	98.2	
Informal votes		9	1.8	
Turnout		504		
F. W. Wathen hold				

1917 Tasmanian local elections: Montagu Ward
Party	Candidate	Votes	%	±%
Independent	Gee Dunkley	282	70.5	+70.5 (Note: no contest held last election)
Independent	M. Cunningham	118	29.5	
Total formal votes		400	98.0	
Informal votes		8	2.0	
Turnout		408		
Gee Dunkley hold				

1917 Tasmanian local elections: West Ward
Party	Candidate	Votes	%	±%
Independent	Arthur Leslie Bigwood	196	51.2	
Independent	William Victor Warren	187	48.8	
Total formal votes		383	98.7	
Informal votes		5	1.3	
Turnout		388		
Arthur Bigwood gain from W. S. Geard				
