= List of ports in Australia =

This is a list of ports in Australia. It includes all gazetted ports, harbours, havens, roadsteads and marinas.

This list is complete with respect to the 1996 Gazetteer of Australia. Dubious names have been checked against the online 2004 data, and in all cases confirmed correct. However, if any ports have been gazetted or deleted since 1996, this list does not reflect these changes. Strictly speaking, Australian place names are gazetted in capital letters only; the names in this list have been converted to mixed case in accordance with normal capitalisation conventions. Locations are as gazetted; obviously some islands may extend over large areas.

The list also contains some entries for places that are widely recognised as ports or harbours, yet have not been gazetted as such. These are noted and individually referenced in the list.

== New South Wales ==
Name	Position	Remarks
Batemans Bay	35°42′S 150°11′E	A minor port administered by Transport for NSW. Fishing and marina. The port was serviced by the Illawarra Steam Navigation Company.
Bellambi Harbour	34°22′S 150°56′E	
Bermagui Harbour	36°25′S 150°04′E	Fishing port. The port was serviced by the Illawarra Steam Navigation Company.
Boat Harbour	28°46′S 153°21′E	
Bulli Harbour	34°20′S 150°56′E	
Cape Hawke Harbour	32°10′S 152°30′E	
Coalcliff Harbour	34°15′S 150°58′E	
Coffs Harbour	30°19′S 153°08′E	
Eden Harbour	37°04′S 149°54′E	Regional port administered by Transport for NSW. Largest artificial harbour in NSW; woodchip export; port shared with Department of Defence (handles warships); also handled cruise ships. The port was serviced by the Illawarra Steam Navigation Company.i
Gerringong Harbour	34°45′S 150°50′E	
Hanleys Wall	30°29′S 153°01′E	
Kiama Harbour	34°40′S 150°51′E	The port was serviced by the Illawarra Steam Navigation Company.
Newcastle Port	32°55′S 151°47′E	Largest coal export terminal in the world. In April 2014 Premier Mike Baird and Treasurer Andrew Constance announced that a “a consortium which comprises Hastings Funds Management and Chinese State-owned China Merchants” had successfully bid $1.75 billion for a 98-year lease of the Port of Newcastle.
North Harbour	32°54′S 151°46′E	
Port Botany	33°59′S 151°12′E	
Port Macquarie Harbour	32°59′S 151°12′E	
Hunter Harbour	32°55′S 151°46′E	
Port Jackson	33°50′S 151°16′E	
Port Kembla	34°28′S 150°54′E	
Nelson Bay	32°42′S 152°00′E	
Shellharbour Harbour	34°35′S 150°52′E	
Sydney Harbour	33°51′S 151°15′E	
Ulladulla Harbour	35°21′S 150°29′E	A minor harbour administered by Transport for NSW. Fishing port. The harbour was serviced by the Illawarra Steam Navigation Company.
Wollongong Harbour	34°25′S 150°54′E	The port was serviced by the Illawarra Steam Navigation Company.
Harbour of Yamba	29°26′S 153°22′E	Regional harbour administered by Transport for NSW. Timber exports; regular general cargo services to Lord Howe Island, Norfolk Island, and New Zealand.

== Northern Territory ==
Name	Position	Remarks
Bynoe Harbour	12°40'S 130°33'E	
Curtis Haven	11°27'S 130°43'E	
Gove Peninsula	12°14'S 136°40'E	
Port Bradshaw	12°30'S 136°44'E	
Port Bremer	11°13'S 132°15'E	
Port Cockburn	11°23'S 130°23'E	
Port Daly	12°12'S 131°12'E	
Port Darwin	12°28'S 130°49'E	The Landbridge Group, a Chinese company, has a 99-year lease on the Port of Darwin
Port Essington	11°16'S 132°09'E	
Port Hurd	11°39'S 130°13'E	
Port Keats	14°07'S 129°32'E	
Port Langdon	13°46'S 136°45'E	
Port Mcarthur	15°47'S 136°42'E	
Port Patterson	12°31'S 130°31'E	
Stokes Hill Wharf	12°28'S 130°51'E	

== Queensland ==
Name	Position	Remarks
Abbot Point	19°53′S 148°5′E	
Bowen	20°4′S 148°21′E	
Port of Brisbane	27°23′S 153°10′E	
Bundaberg Port	24°45′S 152°24′E	
Cairns Harbour	16°54′S 145°47′E	
Cid Harbour	20°15′S 148°56′E	
Port Clinton	22°30′S 150°45′E	
Port Denison	20°2′S 148°15′E	
Port Douglas	16°29′S 145°28′E	
Dungeness Harbour	18°31′S 146°19′E	
Flattery Harbour	14°54′S 145°17′E	
Port of Gladstone	23°50′S 151°35′E	
Hay Point Harbour	21°13′S 149°20′E	
Hay Point Port	21°13′S 149°20′E	
Hope Harbour	27°52′S 153°22′E	
Innisfail Harbour	17°42′S 146°9′E	
Port Lihou	10°45′S 142°11′E	
Mackay	21°10′S 149°14′E	
Mackay Harbour	21°8′S 149°15′E	
Manly Boat Harbour	27°27′S 153°11′E	
Port Molle	20°20′S 148°50′E	
Mooloolaba Boat Harbour	26°41′S 153°8′E	
Mourilyan Harbour	17°37′S 146°7′E	
Port Musgrave	12°1′S 141°57′E	
Port Newry	20°51′S 148°57′E	
Outer Harbour	21°6′S 149°14′E	
Philip Harbour	9°58′S 142°12′E	
Port Alma	23°35′S 150°52′E	
Portland Roads	12°36′S 143°25′E	
Rodds Harbour	24°2′S 151°37′E	
Scarborough Boat Harbour	27°12′S 153°6′E	
Snug Harbour	19°46′S 147°51′E	
Shute Harbour	20°17′S 148°47′E	
Port Stewart	14°4′S 143°41′E	
Toondah Harbour	27°32′S 153°17′E	
Port of Townsville	19°15′S 146°50′E	
Wide Bay Harbour	25°47′S 153°0′E	

== South Australia ==
Name	Position	Remarks
Augusta Harbour	32°46′S 134°13′E	
Ballast Head Harbour	35°46′S 137°48′E	
Blanche Port	32°46′S 134°13′E	
Fishing Boat Harbour	32°09′S 133°39′E	
Flinders Lake	33°43′S 136°57′E	
Franklin Harbour	33°43′S 136°57′E	
Kingscote Harbour	35°39′S 137°40′E	
McLeod Harbour	35°07′S 137°31′E	
Outer Harbor	34°47′S 138°28′E	
Patawalonga Boat Haven	34°58′S 138°31′E	
Port Alfred	34°36′S 137°53′E	
Port Ardrossan	34°26′S 137°55′E	
Port Augusta Harbour	32°30′S 137°46′E	
Port Blanche	32°46′S 134°13′E	
Port Bonython	33°00′S 137°45′E	Panamax plus; oil
Port Caroline	36°50′S 139°50′E	
Port Champagny	34°44′S 135°56′E	
Port Edithburgh	35°04′S 137°46′E	
Port Eyre	32°00′S 132°27′E	
Port Giles	35°02′S 137°46′E	Panamax plus; grain.
Port Glenelg	35°01′S 138°30′E	
Ports Grey and Beachport	37°32′S 140°04′E	
Port Hughes	34°04′S 137°33′E	
Port Irvine	32°05′S 132°59′E	
Port Le Hunte	32°06′S 133°00′E	
Port Lincoln	34°45′S 135°53′E	Panamax plus; grain
Port Milang	35°26′S 138°59′E	
Port Mobilong	35°07′S 139°17′E	
Port Moonta	34°03′S 137°33′E	
Port Neill	34°07′S 136°21′E	
Port Noarlunga	35°09′S 138°28′E	
Port Parnanga	35°07′S 138°28′E	
Port Pirie	33°10′S 138°50′E	Handymax; mineral concentrate, refined lead and zinc, coal, grain and general cargo
Port Pullen	35°33′S 138°53′E	
Port Rickaby	34°39′S 137°29′E	
Port Stansbury	34°53′S 137°49′E	
Port Stanvac	35°7′S 138°28′E	
Port Victoria	34°29′S 137°26′E	
Port Vincent	34°46′S 137°52′E	
Port Warrenne	34°19′S 137°30′E	
Port of Whyalla	33°02′S 137°37′E	Panamax plus; grain, iron ore
Port Willunga	35°18′S 138°25′E	
Port Wool Bay	35°00′S 137°46′E	
Port Yankalilla	35°26′S 138°19′E	
Rosetta Harbour	35°35′S 138°36′E	
Stenhouse Bay Harbor	35°16′S 136°57′E	
Thevenard Harbor	32°07′S 133°38′E	
Victor Harbor	35°34′S 138°38′E	
Whyalla Harbor	33°01′S 137°36′E	

== Tasmania ==
Name	Position	Remarks
Amy Harbour	43°33′S 146°6′E	
Bathurst Harbour	43°21′S 146°11′E	
Bell Bay Harbour	39°51′S 147°47′E	
Conical Harbour	41°42′S 144°55′E	
Currie Harbour	39°56′S 143°50′E	
Port Dalrymple	41°8′S 146°49′E	
East Boat Harbour	40°45′S 147°57′E	
Port Fenton	41°10′S 146°15′E	
Granville Harbour	41°49′S 145°2′E	
Grassy Harbour	40°4′S 144°3′E	
Jack Smiths Boat Harbour	40°26′S 148°3′E	
Jacobs Boat Harbour	40°56′S 145°37′E	
Macquarie Harbour	42°18′S 145°22′E	
Port Maldon	41°2′S 145°50′E	
Manganna Boat Harbour	39°42′S 147°54′E	
New Harbour	43°31′S 146°9′E	
Opossum Boat Harbour	40°13′S 148°16′E	
Parishs Boat Harbour	41°2′S 145°53′E	
Porky Boat Harbour	40°22′S 148°1′E	
Rowitta Harbour	43°19′S 146°11′E	
Port Esperance	43°18′S 147°1′E	
Port Sorell	41°12′S 146°34′E	
Southport	43°27′S 146°59′E	
Stanley Harbour	40°46′S 145°18′E	
Strahan Harbour	42°9′S 145°20′E	
Temma Harbour	41°14′S 144°41′E	
Trial Harbour	41°56′S 145°10′E	

== Victoria ==
Name	Position	Remarks
Anderson Harbour	37°13′S 145°54′E	
Bagge Harbour	38°16′S 145°18′E	
Bass Landing	38°30′S 145°27′E	
Bentley Harbour	38°47′S 146°31′E	
Gabo Harbour	37°34′S 149°55′E	
Geelong	38°7′S 144°23′E	
Hastings	32°22′S 145°13′E	
Melbourne	37°51′S 144°54′E	
Outer Harbour	38°7′S 144°29′E	
Portland	38°20′S 141°36′E	
Reedy Harbour	38°8′S 147°20′E	
Saint Kilda Marina	37°53′S 144°58′E	
Warrnambool Harbour	38°24′S 142°29′E	
Westhaven Boat Harbour	38°19′S 145°12′E	

== Western Australia ==
Name	Position	Remarks
Albany Port	35°2′S 117°54′E	
Balla Balla Harbour	20°40′S 117°47′E	
Batavia Coast Boat Harbour	28°46′S 114°37′E	
Boat Harbour	35°2′S 117°4′E	
Brecknock Harbour	15°28′S 124°33′E	
Port of Bunbury	33°20′S 115°38′E	
Butty Harbour	33°52′S 121°40′E	
Camden Harbour	15°30′S 124°36′E	
Challenger Harbour	32°4′S 115°44′E	
Condon	20°0′S 119°23′E	Abandoned following development of Port Hedland
Cossack	20°41′S 117°11′E	Historic pioneer port for Roebourne
Dampier Port	20°40′S 116°42′E	Railway for iron ore, etc. export
Esperance Port	33°52′S 121°53′E	Railway for iron ore and wheat export
Fishing Boat Harbour	32°4′S 115°45′E	
Fremantle Harbour	32°3′S 115°44′E	General commercial port
Port George IV	15°22′S 124°40′E	
Port of Geraldton	28°47′S 114°36′E	Railway for iron ore and wheat export
Geranium Harbour	13°55′S 126°33′E	
Port Gregory	28°11′S 114°15′E	Originally called Boat Harbour
Port Grey	28°48′S 114°36′E	
Port Harding	35°4′S 117°39′E	Torbay
Port Hedland	20°19′S 118°36′E	Railway for iron ore export
Henri Freycinet Harbour	26°19′S 113°41′E	
Hillarys Boat Harbour	31°49′S 115°44′E	
Port Hughes	35°3′S 117°41′E	Torbay
Jurien Boat Harbour	30°17′S 115°2′E	
Port Kennedy	32°22′S 115°44′E	
Little Boat Harbour	34°28′S 119°22′E	
Mandurah Ocean Marina	32°32′S 115°43′E	
Mary Ann Haven	33°58′S 120°7′E	
Nanarup Boat Harbour	35°0′S 118°4′E	
Port Nelson	15°5′S 125°1′E	
Ocean Reef Boat Harbour	31°46′S 115°44′E	
Oyster Harbour	34°58′S 117°57′E	
Parry Harbour	14°1′S 126°5′E	
Prince Frederick Harbour	15°3′S 125°17′E	
Princess Royal Harbour	35°3′S 117°53′E	More commonly known as Albany Port
Port Robinson	20°39′S 117°2′E	
Rous Head Harbour	32°3′S 115°44′E	
Point Samson	20°38′S 117°12′E	Fishing port; formerly used for Australian Blue Asbestos shiploading.
Port Smith	18°30′S 121°47′E	
Starvation Boat Harbour	33°55′S 120°34′E	
Success Boat Harbour	32°4′S 115°45′E	
Tagon Harbour	33°53′S 122°59′E	
Taylor Boat Harbour	33°55′S 122°50′E	
Port Usborne	16°39′S 123°29′E	
Victoria Harbour (Western Australia)	33°56′S 122°30′E	
Port Walcott	20°39′S 117°11′E	Includes the deep-water wharves at Cape Lambert; Point Samson and Cossack
Port Warrender	14°32′S 125°53′E	
Port Weld	21°23′S 115°33′E	

== See also ==
- List of Australian shipyards
- Ports Australia
- Transportation in Australia
