= List of Australian shipyards =

This is a list of shipyards in Australia:-

- Adelaide Steamship Company (Birkenhead, South Australia) Built tugs. (1957–1973)
- Austal (Henderson, Western Australia) Large and mid sized catamaran ferries, small naval vessels. (1988–present)
- ASC (Part of Osborne Naval Shipyard) Submarines, destroyers, patrol boats. (1985–present)
- BAE Systems Maritime Australia (Based at Osborne Naval Shipyard, subsidiary facilities at Henderson, Western Australia and Williamstown, Victoria)
- BHP (Whyalla, South Australia) (1939–1978)
- Cockatoo Docks & Engineering Company (Cockatoo Island Dockyard, Sydney, New South Wales) (1870–1992)
- Evans Deakin & Company (Brisbane, Queensland) Small naval vessels, trawlers, steamers, bulk carriers, tankers, tugs (1940–1971)
- Forgacs Group (Newcastle, New South Wales) Formerly known as Carrington Slipways. Naval vessels, ferries. (1957–2014)
- Green Point Naval Boatyard Green Point, Mortlake, New South Wales (1940s)
- Incat (Hobart, Tasmania) Large and mid sized catamaran ferries. (1977–present)
- John Wright and Son Shipyards, (Tuncurry, New South Wales) (1875–1958)
- Lars Halvorsen Sons, Sydney
- Morrison & Sinclair (Sydney) Naval vessels, trading and merchant ships, ferries, yachts (1890s – 1970)
- Mort's Dock & Engineering Company (Sydney) (1855–1959)
- Norman R Wright & Sons (Brisbane)
- NQEA (Cairns, Queensland)
- Osborne Naval Shipyard at Osborne, South Australia, the original home of the Australian Submarine Corporation
- Poole & Steel (Sydney, New South Wales) (1912–1954)
- Richardson Devine Marine (Hobart, Tasmania) Aluminium ferries under 45 metres. (1989–present)
- State Dockyard (Newcastle, New South Wales) (1942–1987)
- Walkers Limited (Maryborough, Queensland) (1884–1974)
- Walsh Island Dockyard & Engineering Works (Newcastle, New South Wales) (1913–1933)

== See also ==
- List of ports in Australia
