= Results of the 1913 Tasmanian local elections =

1913 Tasmanian local elections
- 24 April 1913

These are the results of the 1913 Tasmanian local elections.

== Beaconsfield ==
1913 Beaconsfield Municipal Election
- 24 April 1913

4 of the 12 seats on the Beaconsfield Municipal Council

All candidates were elected unopposed with wards East and York sporting newcomers and wards West and Glenorry reelecting incumbent councillors.

=== Beaconsfield results ===
1913 Tasmanian local elections: West Ward
Party	Candidate	Votes	%	±%
Independent	R. Wood (elected unopposed)			
Total formal votes				
Informal votes				
Turnout				
R. Wood hold				

1913 Tasmanian local elections: East Ward
Party	Candidate	Votes	%	±%
Independent	William B. Smith (elected unopposed)			
Total formal votes				
Informal votes				
Turnout				
William B. Smith gain from				

1913 Tasmanian local elections: York Ward
Party	Candidate	Votes	%	±%
Independent	David O'Keefe (elected unopposed)			
Total formal votes				
Informal votes				
Turnout				
David O'Keefe gain from				

1913 Tasmanian local elections: Glenorry Ward
Party	Candidate	Votes	%	±%
Independent	Walter Gowans (elected unopposed)			
Total formal votes				
Informal votes				
Turnout				
Walter Gowans hold				

== Brighton ==
1913 Brighton Municipal Election
- 24 April 1913

4 of the 12 seats on the Brighton Municipal Council

All incumbent councillors were re-elected unopposed.

=== Brighton results ===
1913 Tasmanian local elections: Bagdad Ward
Party	Candidate	Votes	%	±%
Independent	T. J. Eddington (elected unopposed)			
Total formal votes				
Informal votes				
Turnout				
T. J. Eddington hold				

1913 Tasmanian local elections: Bridgewater Ward
Party	Candidate	Votes	%	±%
Independent	J. Tonks (elected unopposed)			
Total formal votes				
Informal votes				
Turnout				
J. Tonks hold				

1913 Tasmanian local elections: Broadmarsh Ward
Party	Candidate	Votes	%	±%
Independent	J. Swan (elected unopposed)			
Total formal votes				
Informal votes				
Turnout				
J. Swan hold				

1913 Tasmanian local elections: Tea Tree Ward
Party	Candidate	Votes	%	±%
Independent	H. Pace (elected unopposed)			
Total formal votes				
Informal votes				
Turnout				
H. Pace hold				

== Clarence ==
1913 Clarence Municipal Election
- 24 April 1913

seats on the Clarence Municipal Council

=== Clarence results ===
1913 Tasmanian local elections: Bellerive Ward
Party	Candidate	Votes	%	±%
Independent	J. O'May			
Independent	E. W. Forwood			
Total formal votes				
Informal votes				
Turnout				

== Deloraine ==
1913 Deloraine Municipal Election
- 24 April 1913

5 of the 15 seats on the Deloraine Municipal Council

Wards Central, High Plains, and Midhurst returned their single candidates unopposed. In wards Chudleigh and Meander, the respective incumbent councillors Briscoe and Hall each faced a challenger.

=== Deloraine results ===
1913 Tasmanian local elections: Chudleigh Ward
Party	Candidate	Votes	%	±%
Independent	F. Briscoe			
Independent	W. R. Picket			
Total formal votes				
Informal votes				
Turnout				

1913 Tasmanian local elections: Meander Ward
Party	Candidate	Votes	%	±%
Independent	Robert Hall			
Independent	J. L. Peters			
Total formal votes				
Informal votes				
Turnout				

1913 Tasmanian local elections: Central Ward
Party	Candidate	Votes	%	±%
Independent	P. H. Gilbert (elected unopposed)			
Total formal votes				
Informal votes				
Turnout				

1913 Tasmanian local elections: High Plains Ward
Party	Candidate	Votes	%	±%
Independent	R. H. Symmons (elected unopposed)			
Total formal votes				
Informal votes				
Turnout				

1913 Tasmanian local elections: Midhurst Ward
Party	Candidate	Votes	%	±%
Independent	E. T. Hingston (elected unopposed)			
Total formal votes				
Informal votes				
Turnout				

== Devonport ==
1913 Devonport Municipal Election
- 24 April 1913

5 of the 15 seats on the Devonport Municipal Council

Half-Holiday Question
- April 24, 1913

Neither Don nor Torquay Wards held elections, returning their incumbent councillors unopposed. In North, South, and Central Wards the incumbent councillors faced challenges. A poll was also held alongside the election on the question of a half-holiday.

=== Devonport results ===
1913 Tasmanian local elections: Don Ward
Party	Candidate	Votes	%	±%
Independent	J. Leary (elected unopposed)			
Total formal votes				
Informal votes				
Turnout				
J. Leary hold				

1913 Tasmanian local elections: Torquay Ward
Party	Candidate	Votes	%	±%
Independent	H. C. Clayton (elected unopposed)			
Total formal votes				
Informal votes				
Turnout				
H. C. Clayton hold				

1913 Tasmanian local elections: North Ward
Party	Candidate	Votes	%	±%
Independent	Cr. W. H. Lewis			
Independent	H. H. McFie			
Independent	E. Ingledew			
Independent	A. W. Marshall			
Total formal votes				
Informal votes				
Turnout				

1913 Tasmanian local elections: Central Ward
Party	Candidate	Votes	%	±%
Independent	Cr. C. J. Hiller			
Independent	W. Jeffrey			
Total formal votes				
Informal votes				
Turnout				

1913 Tasmanian local elections: South Ward
Party	Candidate	Votes	%	±%
Independent	Cr. J. Whitham			
Independent	E. T. Clements			
Independent	H. V. Lane			
Total formal votes				
Informal votes				
Turnout				

== Emu Bay ==
1913 Emu Bay Municipal Election
- 24 April 1913

3 of the 9 seats on the Emu Bay Municipal Council

Incumbent councillors did not nominate for the contest.

=== Emu Bay results ===
1913 Tasmanian local elections: Hampshire Ward
Party	Candidate	Votes	%	±%
Independent	J. F. Crawford			
Independent	J. R. Hilder			
Total formal votes				
Informal votes				
Turnout				
gain from				

== Evandale ==
1913 Evandale Municipal Election
- 24 April 1913

3 of the 9 seats on the Evandale Municipal Council

Three incumbent councillors were re-elected unopposed.

=== Evandale results ===
1913 Tasmanian local elections: Municipality of Evandale
Party	Candidate	Votes	%	±%
Independent	S. Hawley (elected unopposed)			
Total formal votes				
Informal votes				
Turnout				
S. Hawley hold				

1913 Tasmanian local elections: Municipality of Evandale
Party	Candidate	Votes	%	±%
Independent	D. Vicey (elected unopposed)			
Total formal votes				
Informal votes				
Turnout				
D. Vicey hold				

1913 Tasmanian local elections: Municipality of Evandale
Party	Candidate	Votes	%	±%
Independent	D. Lindsay (elected unopposed)			
Total formal votes				
Informal votes				
Turnout				
D. Lindsay hold				

== Fingal ==
1913 Fingal Municipal Election
- 24 April 1913

4 of the 12 seats on the Fingal Municipal Council

Only Town Ward received enough nominations for an election to be held.

=== Fingal results ===
1913 Tasmanian local elections: Town Ward
Party	Candidate	Votes	%	±%
Independent	Frederick Williams			
Independent	James McClenaghan			
Total formal votes				
Informal votes				
Turnout				

1913 Tasmanian local elections: Tower Hill Ward
Party	Candidate	Votes	%	±%
Independent	Michael Polley (elected unopposed)			
Total formal votes				
Informal votes				
Turnout				
Michael Polley hold				

1913 Tasmanian local elections: St. Paul's Ward
Party	Candidate	Votes	%	±%
Independent	H. Frank (elected unopposed)			
Total formal votes				
Informal votes				
Turnout				
H. Frank hold				

1913 Tasmanian local elections: St. Mary's Ward
Party	Candidate	Votes	%	±%
Independent	Leslie Steele (elected unopposed)			
Total formal votes				
Informal votes				
Turnout				
Leslie Steele hold				

== Galmorgan ==
1913 Spring Bay Municipal Election
- 24 April 1913

3 of the 9 seats on the Glamorgan Municipal Council

Only South Ward received enough nominations to hold an election. In the other two wards, the incumbent councillors were re-elected.

1913 Tasmanian local elections: North Ward
Party	Candidate	Votes	%	±%
Independent	Alfred Amos (elected unopposed)			
Total formal votes				
Informal votes				
Turnout				
Alfred Amos hold				

1913 Tasmanian local elections: Central Ward
Party	Candidate	Votes	%	±%
Independent	Arthur Cotton (elected unopposed)			
Total formal votes				
Informal votes				
Turnout				
Arthur Cotton hold				

1913 Tasmanian local elections: South Ward
Party	Candidate	Votes	%	±%
Independent	William Arnol			
Independent	Peter Mitchelmore			
Total formal votes				
Informal votes				
Turnout				

== Glenorchy ==
1913 Glenorchy Municipal Election
- 24 April 1913

3 of the 9 seats on the Glenorchy Municipal Council

All three wards held contests with each incumbent councillor running for re-election.

=== Glenorchy results ===
1913 Tasmanian local elections: Kensington Ward
Party	Candidate	Votes	%	±%
Independent	Cr. T. Barwick			
Independent	H. Elliss			
Independent	J. J. Pitt			
Independent	F. B. Rattle			
Total formal votes				
Informal votes				
Turnout				

1913 Tasmanian local elections: Moonah Ward
Party	Candidate	Votes	%	±%
Independent	Cr. W. M. Wylie			
Independent	W. J. Clifford			
Independent	W. H. O'Neal			
Total formal votes				
Informal votes				
Turnout				

1913 Tasmanian local elections: Bismark Ward
Party	Candidate	Votes	%	±%
Independent	Cr. G. H. Voss			
Independent	F. H. Gall			
Independent	A. Tottenhoffer			
Total formal votes				
Informal votes				
Turnout				

== Hamilton ==
1913 Hamilton Municipal Election
- 24 April 1913

3 of the 9 seats on the Hamilton Municipal Council

=== Hamilton results ===
1913 Tasmanian local elections: North Ward
Party	Candidate	Votes	%	±%
Independent	Cr. Henrie C. Nicholas			
Independent	Laurence Ashton Jones			
Total formal votes				
Informal votes				
Turnout				

1913 Tasmanian local elections: Central Ward
Party	Candidate	Votes	%	±%
Independent	John W. Downie (elected unopposed)			
Total formal votes				
Informal votes				
Turnout				
John W. Downie hold				

1913 Tasmanian local elections: South Ward
Party	Candidate	Votes	%	±%
Independent	William J. Stanfield (elected unopposed)			
Total formal votes				
Informal votes				
Turnout				
William J. Stanfield hold				

== Huon ==
1913 Huon Municipal Election
- 24 April 1913

5 of the 12 seats on the Huon Municipal Council

A by-election for Franklin Ward cause by the retirement of Councillor J. P. Ryan coincided with this periodic election. Both Franklin Ward seats as well as Upper Huon Ward were returned unopposed.

=== Huon results ===
1913 Tasmanian local elections: Franklin Ward
Party	Candidate	Votes	%	±%
Independent	C. Reeves (elected unopposed)			
Total formal votes				
Informal votes				
Turnout				
C. Reeves hold				

1913 Tasmanian local elections: Franklin Ward by-election
Party	Candidate	Votes	%	±%
Independent	William Carr (elected unopposed)			
Total formal votes				
Informal votes				
Turnout				
William Carr gain from J. P. Ryan				

1913 Tasmanian local elections: Woodstock Ward
Party	Candidate	Votes	%	±%
Independent	Cr. A. Griffiths			
Independent	James Cannell			
Total formal votes				
Informal votes				
Turnout				

1913 Tasmanian local elections: Victoria Ward
Party	Candidate	Votes	%	±%
Independent	Cr. W. Talbot			
Independent	W. H. Calvert			
Total formal votes				
Informal votes				
Turnout				

1913 Tasmanian local elections: Upper Huon Ward
Party	Candidate	Votes	%	±%
Independent	V. J. Skinner (elected unopposed)			
Total formal votes				
Informal votes				
Turnout				
V. J. Skinner hold				

== Kentish ==
1913 Kentish Municipal Election
- 24 April 1913

5 of the 15 seats on the Kentish Municipal Council

Only Wilmont Ward saw a contest with the incumbent councillor French facing one challenger. The other four wards returned each of their single candidates unopposed.

=== Kentish results ===
1913 Tasmanian local elections: Sheffield Ward
Party	Candidate	Votes	%	±%
Independent	J. Hope (elected unopposed)			
Total formal votes				
Informal votes				
Turnout				
J. Hope hold				

1913 Tasmanian local elections: Railton Ward
Party	Candidate	Votes	%	±%
Independent	S. Blythe (elected unopposed)			
Total formal votes				
Informal votes				
Turnout				

1913 Tasmanian local elections: Roland Ward
Party	Candidate	Votes	%	±%
Independent	G. Morse (elected unopposed)			
Total formal votes				
Informal votes				
Turnout				
G. Morse hold				

1913 Tasmanian local elections: Tarleton Ward
Party	Candidate	Votes	%	±%
Independent	H. Keep (elected unopposed)			
Total formal votes				
Informal votes				
Turnout				

1913 Tasmanian local elections: Wilmont Ward
Party	Candidate	Votes	%	±%
Independent	Cr. W. French			
Independent	W. E. Hitchcock			
Total formal votes				
Informal votes				
Turnout				

== Kingborough ==
1913 Kingborough Municipal Election
- 24 April 1913

7 of the seats on the Kingborough Municipal Council

Only Margate Ward received enough nominations to hold a contest.

=== Kingborough results ===
1913 Tasmanian local elections: Channel Ward
Party	Candidate	Votes	%	±%
Independent	Cr. J. S. Robertson (elected unopposed)			
Independent	W. H. Cripps (elected unopposed)			
Total formal votes				
Informal votes				
Turnout				
J. S. Robertson hold				
W. H. Cripps gain from				

1913 Tasmanian local elections: Kingston Ward
Party	Candidate	Votes	%	±%
Independent	Cr. J. H. Rule (elected unopposed)			
Total formal votes				
Informal votes				
Turnout				
J. H. Rule hold				

1913 Tasmanian local elections: Longley Ward
Party	Candidate	Votes	%	±%
Independent	G. Knop (elected unopposed)			
Independent	M. E. Rolling (elected unopposed)			
Total formal votes				
Informal votes				
Turnout				
G. Knop gain from				
M. E. Rolling gain from				

1913 Tasmanian local elections: Margate Ward
Party	Candidate	Votes	%	±%
Independent	Cr. P. J. Torpy			
Independent	Cr. R. J. Groombridge			
Independent	A. H. Hart			
Total formal votes				
Informal votes				
Turnout				

== Latrobe ==
1913 Latrobe Municipal Election
- 24 April 1913

4 of the 9 seats on the Latrobe Municipal Council

Only Sherwood Ward held an election as the incumbent councillor in Harford Ward and the single candidate in Sassafras Ward were both returned unopposed.

=== Latrobe results ===
1913 Tasmanian local elections: Sherwood Ward
Party	Candidate	Votes	%	±%
Independent	J. D. Johnston			
Independent	Dr. G. A. Walpole			
Independent				
Total formal votes				
Informal votes				
Turnout				

1913 Tasmanian local elections: Harford Ward
Party	Candidate	Votes	%	±%
Independent	Guy Parsons (elected unopposed)			
Total formal votes				
Informal votes				
Turnout				
Guy Parsons hold				

1913 Tasmanian local elections: Sassafras Ward
Party	Candidate	Votes	%	±%
Independent	V. Rockliffe (elected unopposed)			
Total formal votes				
Informal votes				
Turnout				
V. Rockliffe gain from				

== Leven ==
1913 Leven Municipal Election
- 24 April 1913

4 of the 12 seats on the Leven Municipal Council

The incumbent councillors for Abbotsham and Motton Wards and the single candidate for Castra Ward were all elected unopposed. Only Ulverstone received enough nominations to hold a contest.

=== Leven results ===
1913 Tasmanian local elections: Abbotsham Ward
Party	Candidate	Votes	%	±%
Independent	incumbent councillor (elected unopposed)			
Total formal votes				
Informal votes				
Turnout				
incumbent councillor hold				

1913 Tasmanian local elections: Motton Ward
Party	Candidate	Votes	%	±%
Independent	incumbent councillor (elected unopposed)			
Total formal votes				
Informal votes				
Turnout				
incumbent councillor hold				

1913 Tasmanian local elections: Castra Ward
Party	Candidate	Votes	%	±%
Independent	J. Wright (elected unopposed)			
Total formal votes				
Informal votes				
Turnout				
J. Wright gain from				

1913 Tasmanian local elections: Ulverstone Ward
Party	Candidate	Votes	%	±%
Independent	H. A. Nichols			
Independent	R. Scott			
Total formal votes				
Informal votes				
Turnout				

== Longford ==
1913 Longford Municipal Election
- 24 April 1913

4 of the 9 seats on the Longford Municipal Council

=== Longford results ===
1913 Tasmanian local elections: Town Ward
Party	Candidate	Votes	%	±%
Independent	A. Youl (elected unopposed)			
Total formal votes				
Informal votes				
Turnout				
A. Youl hold				

1913 Tasmanian local elections: Cressy Ward
Party	Candidate	Votes	%	±%
Independent	J. H. Freeland			
Independent	H. A. Field			
Total formal votes				
Informal votes				
Turnout				

1913 Tasmanian local elections: Bishopsbourne Ward
Party	Candidate	Votes	%	±%
Independent	R. Rickett			
Independent	J. Bottomley			
Independent	P. C. Wayn			
Total formal votes				
Informal votes				
Turnout				

== New Town ==
1913 New Town Municipal Election
- 24 April 1913

4 of the 9 seats on the New Town Municipal Council

Incumbent Loinah Ward councillor F. M. Young transferred to Augusta Ward. Councillor Heyward of Augusta Ward resigned a year into his three-year term prompting, under the Local Government Act 1906, a by-election to coincide with the annual election.

=== New Town results ===
1913 Tasmanian local elections: Loinah Ward
Party	Candidate	Votes	%	±%
Independent	L. M. Shoobridge (elected unopposed)			
Total formal votes				
Informal votes				
Turnout				
L. M. Shoobridge gain from F. M. Young				

1913 Tasmanian local elections: Central Ward
Party	Candidate	Votes	%	±%
Independent	Nat. Oldham (elected unopposed)			
Total formal votes				
Informal votes				
Turnout				
Nat. Oldham gain from G. Smale				

1913 Tasmanian local elections: Augusta Ward
Party	Candidate	Votes	%	±%
Independent	F. M. Young (elected unopposed)			
Total formal votes				
Informal votes				
Turnout				
F. M. Young gain from G. Albury				

1913 Tasmanian local elections: Augusta Ward by-election
Party	Candidate	Votes	%	±%
Total formal votes				
Informal votes				
Turnout				
	gain from Heyward			

== Oatlands ==
1913 Oatlands Municipal Election
- 24 April 1913

3 of the 9 seats on the Oatlands Municipal Council

=== Oatlands results ===
1913 Tasmanian local elections: Dulverton Ward
Party	Candidate	Votes	%	±%
Independent	W. Calvert (elected unopposed)			
Total formal votes				
Informal votes				
Turnout				
W. Calvert hold				

1913 Tasmanian local elections: Dulverton Ward
Party	Candidate	Votes	%	±%
Independent	Cr. A. J. O'Connor			
Independent	Frederick Burbury			
Independent	W. Hyland			
Independent	T. O'Brien			
Total formal votes				
Informal votes				
Turnout				

1913 Tasmanian local elections: Tunbridge Ward
Party	Candidate	Votes	%	±%
No nominations
Total formal votes				
Informal votes				
Turnout				

== Penguin ==
1913 Penguin Municipal Election
- 24 April 1913

4 of the 9 seats on Penguin Municipal Council

Dial Ward returned its single candidate unopposed, the incumbent councillor for Heybridge Ward faced to challengers.

=== Penguin results ===
1913 Tasmanian local elections: Dial Ward
Party	Candidate	Votes	%	±%
Independent	G. G. Pullen M. H. A. (elected unopposed)			
Total formal votes				
Informal votes				
Turnout				

1913 Tasmanian local elections: Heybridge Ward
Party	Candidate	Votes	%	±%
Independent	Cr. J. Cameron			
Independent	F. C. von Bibra			
Independent	H. Lillico			
Total formal votes				
Informal votes				
Turnout				

== Queenborough ==
1913 Queenborough Municipal Election
- 24 April 1913

4 of the 12 seats on Queenborough Municipal Council

The incumbent councillors of Sand, Ridgeway, and Wellington Wards were returned unopposed. Only Nelson Ward held an contest where the incumbent councillor faced one challenger.

=== Queenborough ===
1913 Tasmanian local elections: Sand Ward
Party	Candidate	Votes	%	±%
Independent	A. W. Adams (elected unopposed)			
Total formal votes				
Informal votes				
Turnout				
A. W. Adams hold				

1913 Tasmanian local elections: Ridgeway Ward
Party	Candidate	Votes	%	±%
Independent	G. A. Dehle (elected unopposed)			
Total formal votes				
Informal votes				
Turnout				
G. A. Dehle hold				

1913 Tasmanian local elections: Wellington Ward
Party	Candidate	Votes	%	±%
Independent	R. D. Barker (elected unopposed)			
Total formal votes				
Informal votes				
Turnout				
R. D. Barker hold				

1913 Tasmanian local elections: Nelson Ward
Party	Candidate	Votes	%	±%
Independent	Cr. M. Fletcher			
Independent	L. J. F. Lipscombe			
Total formal votes				
Informal votes				
Turnout				

== Queenstown ==
1913 Queenstown Municipal Election
- 24 April 1913

4 of the 9 seats on the Queenstown Municipal Council

All wards held elections. An extraordinary election was to be held to fill a vacancy in South Ward.

The incumbent Warden and Chairman of the Queenstown Licensing Bench going into the election, Alfred Webb, was defeated in the polls. Cr. Lawson succeeded him in the position of Warden but not in the Chairman role as he was not yet a sworn in justice of the peace and Cr. H. Curtin took on that position instead.

=== Queenstown results ===
1913 Tasmanian local elections: North Ward
Party	Candidate	Votes	%	±%
Independent	Cr. M. Donnelly			
Independent	Chas. Grub			
Total formal votes				
Informal votes				
Turnout				

1913 Tasmanian local elections: Central Ward
Party	Candidate	Votes	%	±%
Independent	John Carvel			
Independent	James Sheehan			
Independent	John Fraser			
Independent	George Berry			
Total formal votes				
Informal votes				
Turnout				

1913 Tasmanian local elections: South Ward
Party	Candidate	Votes	%	±%
Independent	Cr. Alfred Webb			
Independent	Joseph Briggs			
Independent	James Campbell			
Total formal votes				
Informal votes				
Turnout				
gain from Alfred Webb		Swing		

1913 Tasmanian local elections: South Ward extraordinary election
Party	Candidate	Votes	%	±%
Independent	Charles Evans			
Independent	Thomas Cook			
Independent	George Phillips			
Independent	James Coxall			
Total formal votes				
Informal votes				
Turnout				
gain from				

== Richmond ==
1913 Richmond Municipal Election
- 24 April 1913

3 of the 9 seats on the Fingal Municipal Council

=== Richmond results ===
1913 Tasmanian local elections: North Ward
Party	Candidate	Votes	%	±%
Independent	Thos. Bevan			
Total formal votes				
Informal votes				
Turnout				

1913 Tasmanian local elections: Central Ward
Party	Candidate	Votes	%	±%
Independent	H. J. Kelly			
Independent	R. Johnson			
Total formal votes				
Informal votes				
Turnout				

1913 Tasmanian local elections: South Ward
Party	Candidate	Votes	%	±%
Independent	K. A. Ogilvy			
Total formal votes				
Informal votes				
Turnout				

== Scottsdale ==
1913 Scottsdale Municipal Election
- 24 April 1913

3 of the 9 seats on the Scottsdale Municipal Council

=== Scottsdale results ===
1913 Tasmanian local elections: Springfield Ward
Party	Candidate	Votes	%	±%
Independent	D. Beatile (elected unopposed)			
Total formal votes				
Informal votes				
Turnout				
D. Beatile hold				

1913 Tasmanian local elections: Town Ward
Party	Candidate	Votes	%	±%
Independent	T. H. Brewer (elected unopposed)			
Total formal votes				
Informal votes				
Turnout				
T. H. Brewer hold				

1913 Tasmanian local elections: Jetsonville Ward
Party	Candidate	Votes	%	±%
Independent	Cr. J. Cavanagh			
Independent	A. Coplestone			
Total formal votes				
Informal votes				
Turnout				

== Sorell ==
1913 Sorell Municipal Election
- 24 April 1913

4 of the 12 seats on the Sorell Municipal Council

Only Bream Creek Ward received enough candidates to prompt an election. The other three wards were retained by their incumbent councillors.

=== Sorell results ===
1913 Tasmanian local elections: Orielton Ward
Party	Candidate	Votes	%	±%
Independent	Thomas Small Hean (elected unopposed)			
Total formal votes				
Informal votes				
Turnout				
Thomas Small Hean hold				

1913 Tasmanian local elections: Wattle Hill Ward
Party	Candidate	Votes	%	±%
Independent	James Quarrell (elected unopposed)			
Total formal votes				
Informal votes				
Turnout				
James Quarrell hold				

1913 Tasmanian local elections: Foicett Ward
Party	Candidate	Votes	%	±%
Independent	Albert Henry Reardon (elected unopposed)			
Total formal votes				
Informal votes				
Turnout				
Albert Henry Reardon hold				

1913 Tasmanian local elections: Bream Creek Ward
Party	Candidate	Votes	%	±%
Independent	Cr. John William Allanby			
Independent	August Clifford			
Total formal votes				
Informal votes				
Turnout				

== Spring Bay ==
1913 Spring Bay Municipal Election
- 24 April 1913

3 of the 9 seats on the Spring Bay Municipal Council

North and Central Wards both re-elected their councillors unopposed. South Ward received no nominations for candidates.

=== Spring Bay results ===
1913 Tasmanian local elections: North Ward
Party	Candidate	Votes	%	±%
Independent	S. W. Gould (elected unopposed)			
Total formal votes				
Informal votes				
Turnout				
S. W. Gould hold				

1913 Tasmanian local elections: Central Ward
Party	Candidate	Votes	%	±%
Independent	H. G. Rudd			
Total formal votes				
Informal votes				
Turnout				
H. G. Rudd hold				

1913 Tasmanian local elections: South Ward
Party	Candidate	Votes	%	±%
No nominations
Total formal votes				
Informal votes				
Turnout				

== Strahan ==
1913 Strahan Municipal Election
- 24 April 1913

3 of the 9 seats on the Strahan Municipal Council

Central and East Wards both re-elected their incumbent councillours unopposed, with only West Ward holding an election where the incumbent councillor and two others stood as candidates.

=== Strahan results ===
1913 Tasmanian local elections: West Ward
Party	Candidate	Votes	%	±%
Independent	Cr. Geo. H. Rayner			
Independent	Tasman William Hamer			
Independent	John William Sargent			
Total formal votes				
Informal votes				
Turnout				

1913 Tasmanian local elections: Central Ward
Party	Candidate	Votes	%	±%
Independent	Alfred Slater (elected unopposed)			
Total formal votes				
Informal votes				
Turnout				
Alfred Slater hold				

1913 Tasmanian local elections: East Ward
Party	Candidate	Votes	%	±%
Independent	Henry Smith (elected unopposed)			
Total formal votes				
Informal votes				
Turnout				
Henry Smith hold				

== St. Leonards ==
1913 St. Leonards Municipal Election
- 24 April 1913

seats on the St. Leonards Municipal Council

Incumbent councillor Grub faced one competitor in Esk Ward. Patersonia Ward elected both of its candidates unopposed.

=== St. Leonards results ===
1913 Tasmanian local elections: Patersonia Ward
Party	Candidate	Votes	%	±%
Independent	G. B. Dean (elected unopposed)			
Independent	J. H. Garratt (elected unopposed)			
Total formal votes				
Informal votes				
Turnout				
G. B. Dean gain from				
J. H. Garratt gain from				

1913 Tasmanian local elections: Esk Ward
Party	Candidate	Votes	%	±%
Independent	W. C. Grub			
Independent	W. A. Whittle			
Total formal votes				
Informal votes				
Turnout				

== Table Cape ==
1913 Table Cape Municipal Election
- 24 April 1913

4 of the 12 seats on the Table Cape Municipal Council

Only half of the four wards received enough nominations to hold elections. Wards Calder and Cani both returned their incumbent councillors unopposed and the incumbent councillors Garner and Chapple in wards Wynyard and Flowerdale respectfully faced challengers.

=== Table Cape results ===
1913 Tasmanian local elections: Wynyard Ward
Party	Candidate	Votes	%	±%
Independent	Jas. Belton			
Independent	William Garner			
Total formal votes				
Informal votes				
Turnout				
Henry Smith hold				

1913 Tasmanian local elections: Calder Ward
Party	Candidate	Votes	%	±%
Independent	J. Bauld (elected unopposed)			
Total formal votes				
Informal votes				
Turnout				
J. Bauld hold				

1913 Tasmanian local elections: Cani Ward
Party	Candidate	Votes	%	±%
Independent	H. Neil (elected unopposed)			
Total formal votes				
Informal votes				
Turnout				
H. Neil hold				

1913 Tasmanian local elections: Flowerdale Ward
Party	Candidate	Votes	%	±%
Independent	G. S. Chapple			
Independent	J. W. Cooper			
Independent	E. T. Norton Smith			
Total formal votes				
Informal votes				
Turnout				

== Waratah ==
1913 Waratah Municipal Election
- 24 April 1913

3 of the 9 seats on the Waratah Municipal Council

=== Waratah results ===
1913 Tasmanian local elections: North Ward
Party	Candidate	Votes	%	±%
Independent	E. N. Matthews			
Independent	J. H. Thorne			
Total formal votes				
Informal votes				
Turnout				
gain from				

1913 Tasmanian local elections: East Ward
Party	Candidate	Votes	%	±%
Independent	Cr. E. Brown			
Independent	D. Jones			
Total formal votes				
Informal votes				
Turnout				

1913 Tasmanian local elections: South Ward
Party	Candidate	Votes	%	±%
Independent	Cr. E. O. Riggs			
Independent	C. Sheedy			
Total formal votes				
Informal votes				
Turnout				

== Zeehan ==
1913 Zeehan Municipal Election
- 24 April 1913

3 of the 9 seats on the Zeehan Municipal Council

The incumbent councillors for Montagu and East Wards were returned unopposed, the incumbent councillor in West Ward faced Independent challenger P. W. Johnstone who had run unsuccessfully last year.

The election was won by Johnstone.

Following the council receiving a petition from over 100 ratepayers requesting it, the council planned for a poll on deciding the day of a half-holiday be held alongside the election.

=== Zeehan results ===
1913 Tasmanian local elections: West Ward
Party	Candidate	Votes	%	±%
Independent	P. W. Johnstone	203	52.59	+27.83
Independent	Charles Murphy	183	47.41	+20.38
Total formal votes		386		
Informal votes				
Turnout				
P. W. Johnstone gain from Charles Murphy		Swing		

1913 Tasmanian local elections: Montagu Ward
Party	Candidate	Votes	%	±%
Independent	George Barker (elected unopposed)			
Total formal votes				
Informal votes				
Turnout				
George Barker hold		Swing		

1913 Tasmanian local elections: East Ward
Party	Candidate	Votes	%	±%
Independent	Captain W. Fisher (elected unopposed)			
Total formal votes				
Informal votes				
Turnout				
Captain W. Fisher hold		Swing		
