= Results of the 1912 Tasmanian local elections =

1912 Tasmanian local election
- 26 April 1912

== Queenstown ==
1912 Queenstown Municipal Council election
- 26 April 1912

1/3 of the seats on Queenstown Municipal Council

Only South Ward held a contest, which was retained by the retiring councillor by a margin of 8 votes.

=== Queenstown results ===
1912 Tasmanian local elections: South Ward
Party	Candidate	Votes	%	±%
Independent	C. Witham			
Independent	Jas. Coxall			
Total formal votes				
Informal votes				
Turnout				
C. Witham hold		Swing		

== Zeehan ==
1912 Zeehan Municipal Council election
- 26 April 1912

4 seats on Zeehan Municipal Council

Elections were held in West Wards and Montagu Ward, in East Ward the incumbent councillor was returned unopposed.

There was an additional vacancy in West Ward and so the candidate who came in second was to be elected for a one year term to fill the vacancy. This was won by Charles Murphy.

=== Zeehan results ===
1912 Tasmanian local elections: West Ward
Party	Candidate	Votes	%	±%
Independent	J. Reynolds (elected 1)	255	48.20	
Independent	Charles Murphy (elected 2)	143	27.03	
Independent	P. W. Johnstone	131	24.76	
Total formal votes		529	98.51	
Informal votes		8	1.49	
Turnout		537		
J. Reynolds hold		Swing		
Charles Murphy gain from		Swing		

1912 Tasmanian local elections: Montagu Ward (Note: Unofficial results)
Party	Candidate	Votes	%	±%
Independent	Connolly	217	76.68	
Independent	Burns	66	23.32	
Total formal votes		283	98.95	
Informal votes		3	1.05	
Turnout		286		

1912 Tasmanian local elections: East Ward
Party	Candidate	Votes	%	±%
Independent	R. W. Maskell (elected unopposed)			
Total formal votes				
Informal votes				
Turnout				
R. W. Maskell hold		Swing		
