= Newcastle Cruise Terminal =

General information
- Status: Never built
- Type: Cruise terminal
- Architectural style: Modernist
- Location: Newcastle, New South Wales, Australia
- Owner: Government of New South Wales

Technical details
- Floor area: 3,000 m^{2} (32,000 sq ft)

Design and construction
- Architect: GHD Woodhead
- Developer: Government of New South Wales

References
- Port of Newcastle website

Newcastle Cruise Terminal was a proposed cruise terminal in Newcastle, New South Wales, Australia. The cruise terminal was proposed to be built at the Channel Berth in the Port of Newcastle.

Funding was to be provided by the Government of New South Wales’s Restart NSW Hunter Infrastructure Investment Fund. The project was cancelled in 2019 after Infrastructure NSW advised funding would no longer be available.
