= Ochre Health =

Australian healthcare services company

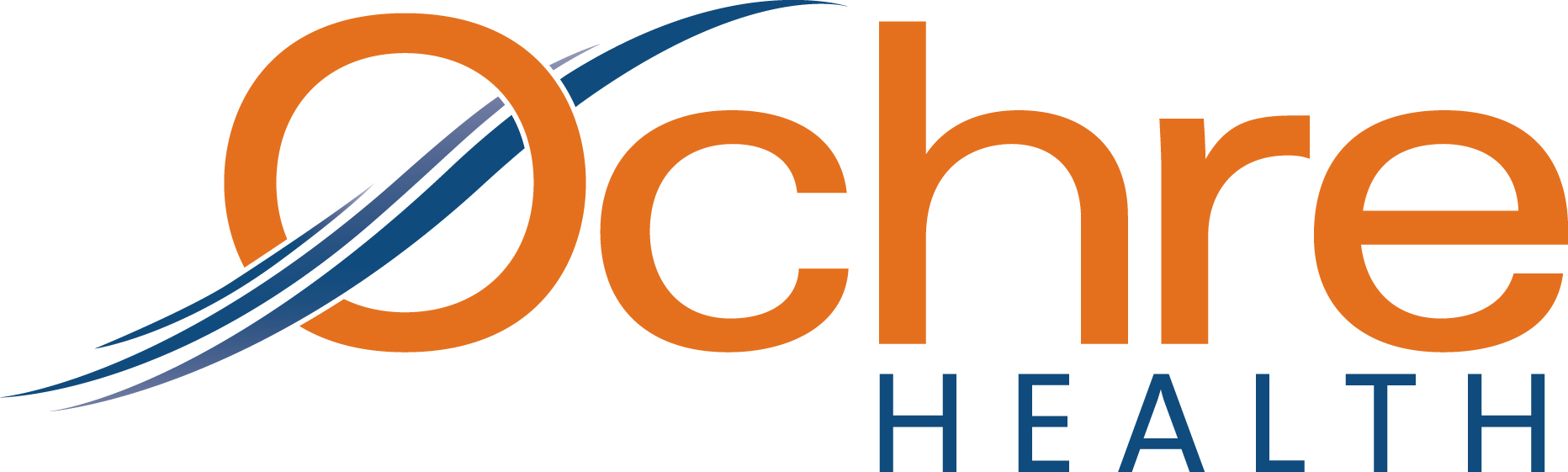
- Type: Private
- Industry: Health Care and Medicine
- Founded: 2002
- Headquarters: Sydney, Australia
- Area served: Australia
- Key people: Dr Hamish Meldrum (Co-Founder); Dr Ross Lamplugh (Co-founder)
- Number of employees: 180 (2014)
- Website: www.ochrehealth.com.au

Ochre Health is an Australian healthcare services company headquartered in Sydney. The company specialises in the provision of health services to outer-urban, regional, and remote communities.

== History ==
Ochre Health was established in 2002 by doctors Hamish Meldrum and Ross Lamplugh.

Meldrum and Lamplugh were providing General Practice and hospital services in the town of Bourke, NSW, and were concerned by the lack of medical practitioner support that was available to them and their colleagues. The two doctors decided to take action by establishing a locum doctor recruitment agency, Ochre Recruitment. The service found itself in high demand and enabled the creation of Ochre Health, which was responsible for providing ongoing management of rural medical services that were under distress by providing recruitment, clinical and administrative governance.

The Ochre Health Foundation was subsequently established in 2005 as a non-profit entity. The primary objective of the Foundation is to provide medical and allied health services to regional and remote communities to aid in the prevention and control of chronic diseases.

== Services ==
Ochre Health provides a range of clinical management, governance and recruitment services, and employs approximately 400 staff across Australia. The company has also established relationships with universities to assist with medical student placements and the distribution of experimental programs to remote villages.

Ochre Health works with communities to assist them to address their health workforce and health outcome challenges, by partnering to develop a sustainable and community dictated model of operation.

Services include:

- General practice
- Emergency medicine
- Occupational medicine
- Obstetrics
- Anesthetics
- Dental
- Allied health
- Nursing
- Medical recruitment
- Health administration
- Health Services consulting

== Operations ==
Ochre Health currently provides medical services to communities across various states and territories of Australia including the Australian Capital Territory, New South Wales, Queensland, Victoria and Tasmania.

These communities exhibited unmet health staffing levels before the organisation commenced working with them, and now exhibit record levels of male and female medical practitioners.

== Health outcomes ==
=== Background ===
Ochre Health has a record of providing medical services to communities that have experienced long-term difficulties in attracting and retaining appropriate levels of medical staff, often due to their remoteness or their isolation from social services.

The company also provides services to communities that have high levels of social disadvantage, health outcomes which fall below national averages, and hospitalisation rates which fall above national averages.

=== Primary health care ===
Ochre Health has been able to reduce hospitalisation rates by up to 20% in communities that exhibited hospitalisation rates above national averages by increasing community access to medical practitioners, through which patients' health conditions can be managed, and by adopting best-practice primary care principles as a core tenet of their service delivery model.

The company has also pioneered several new protocols for managing primary care patients, which involves the provision of chronic disease management in towns with high levels of social disadvantage and rates of diabetes and other chronic conditions.
