= Ports Australia =

Industry trade group representing Australian port authorities and corporations

Ports Australia is the peak body representing Australia's port authorities and corporations. The organisation's membership includes Government owned ports, some privatised ports, state marine regulatory authorities and the Department of Defence through the Royal Australian Navy. It was originally formed in 1916 as the 'interstate harbour conference in Melbourne' and officially changed its name from Association of Australian Port and Marine Authorities in 2007. Its main offices are located in Sydney.

== Port Sector ==
As an island nation, Australia is dependent on shipping for both international trade and domestic freight movements (coastal trading). As such, our major ports and related infrastructure provide the key locations for supply chain activities servicing both bulk and container facilities.

The private sector is the major player in port operations and investment, with the regulatory framework set by government. State and territory governments have responsibility for land use planning and controls, including for ports, their adjacent land areas and connecting transport systems. Local government also makes decisions that affect ports, including on matters such as planning requirements and local road access. State or territory governments have historically owned port authorities; however there is a trend toward privatising these assets on a long-term lease basis.

Commonwealth responsibilities relating to ports include: environmental assessment of port developments where matters of national environmental significance are concerned, safety and security matters, customs, and implementing Australia's international maritime obligations as they relate to ports.

=== Australia's freight task ===
Australia's ports handle the fifth largest shipping task of any nation in the world moving over $1.2 billion worth of freight daily.

== See also ==
- Government of Australia
- List of Australian ports.
