= Port of Newcastle =

Seaport in Newcastle, NSW, Australia

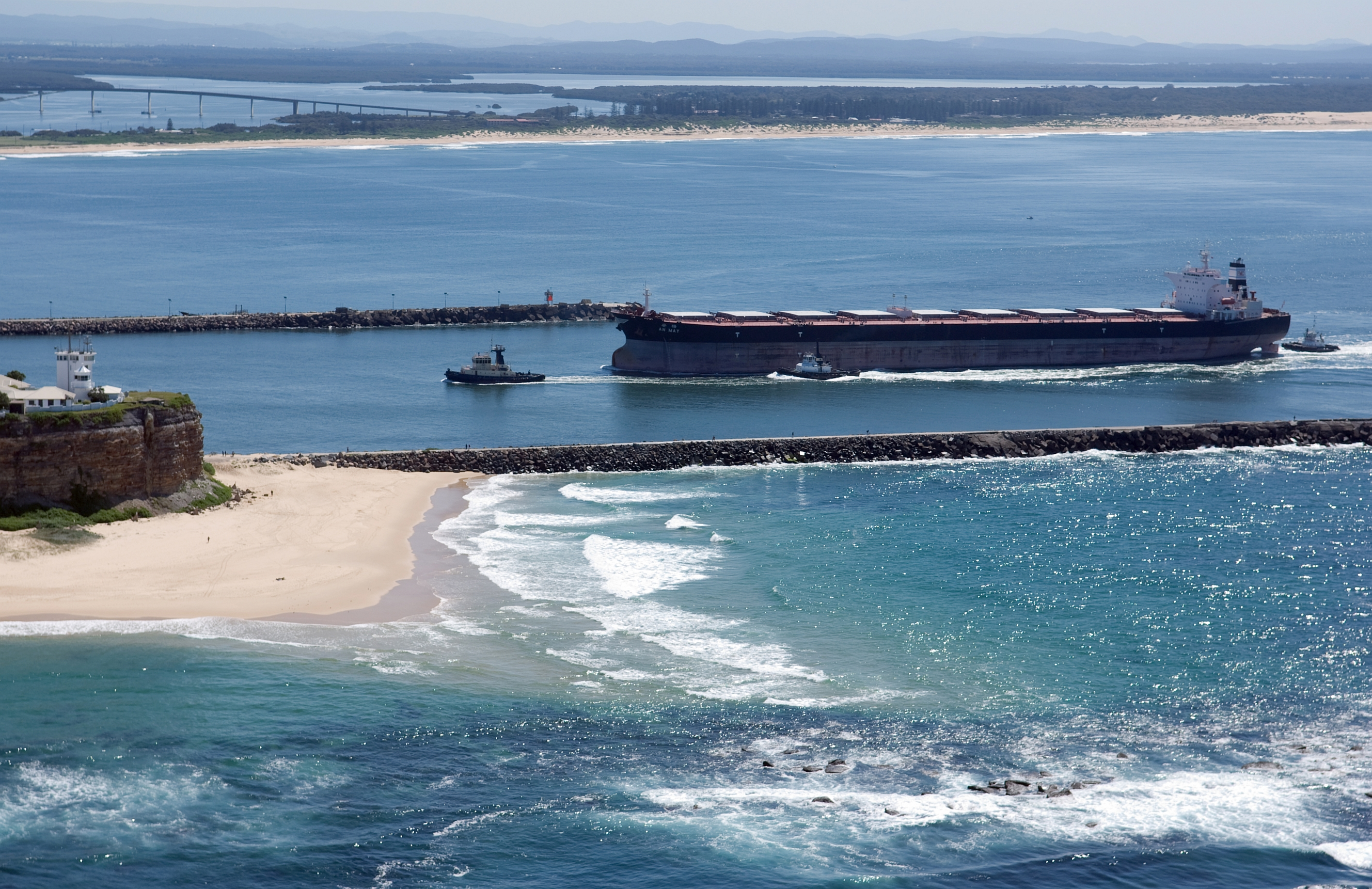
- A bulk carrier entering Port Hunter, Newcastle
- Interactive map of Port of Newcastle
- Location within Australia

Location
- Country: Australia
- Location: Newcastle, New South Wales
- Coordinates: 32°55′S 151°48′E
- UN/LOCODE: AUNTL

Details
- Operated by: Port of Newcastle Operations Ltd
- No. of berths: 20
- Draft depth: 16.2 m.

Statistics
- Website www.portofnewcastle.com.au

The Port of Newcastle is a major seaport in the city of Newcastle, New South Wales, Australia. It is the world's largest coal port.

It is made up of facilities located at Port Hunter - Yohaaba in the Hunter River estuary. The port was the first commercial export port in Australia and is the world's busiest coal export port. Annual exports of coal from Newcastle exceeded A$15 billion in 2012–13. Newcastle berthed more than 2,200 ships a year in 2012–13.

The port's harbourmaster is the Port Authority of New South Wales. Cargo facilities are operated by Port Waratah Coal Services and Newcastle Coal Infrastructure Group at Kooragang Island, as well as other operators at Mayfield, Carrington and Walsh Point. There are plans to build a cruise terminal.

In April 2014 Premier Mike Baird and Treasurer Andrew Constance announced that "a consortium which comprises Hastings Funds Management and Chinese state-owned China Merchants" had successfully bid $1.75 billion for a 98-year lease of the Port of Newcastle.

In 2017, coal had represented approximately 90% of its trade. According to The Guardian, the incoming chairman declared that the port will seek to "diversify its traffic" as he warned of "the long term outlook for coal was a threat to the port".

== History ==
=== Pre-colonial history ===
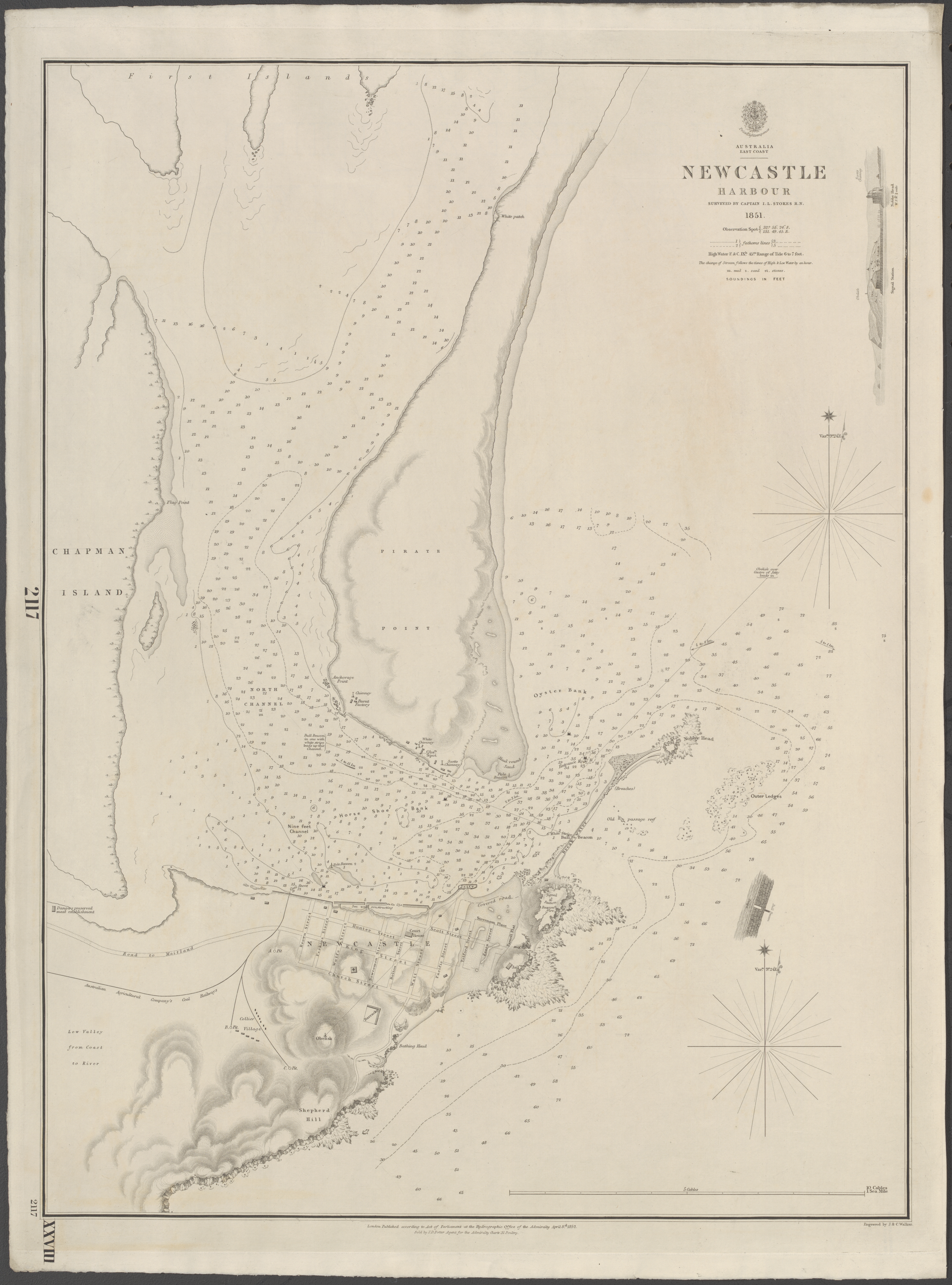
Admiralty Chart No 2117 Australia, East Coast, Newcastle Harbour, Published 1852

The Awabakal people were the inhabitants of Newcastle (Muloobinba) living around the harbour and foreshore prior to European contact. Discarded shells of shellfish harvested by local clans for thousands of years formed enormous middens which were burned by Europeans to produce lime for building purposes. The first commercial shipment was recorded in 1799.

Dredging of the harbour began in 1859. In July 2016, Port Hunter was officially dual named Yohaaba, its local Indigenous name.

=== Shipwrecks ===
It has been estimated that over 200 vessels have been lost entering or leaving the Port of Newcastle. Vessels have been recorded lost in and around the areas of Port Hunter, Hunter River, Nobbys Head, Stockton Bight, Stockton Beach (Newcastle Beach), Oyster Bank, Williams River and inland Raymond Terrace.

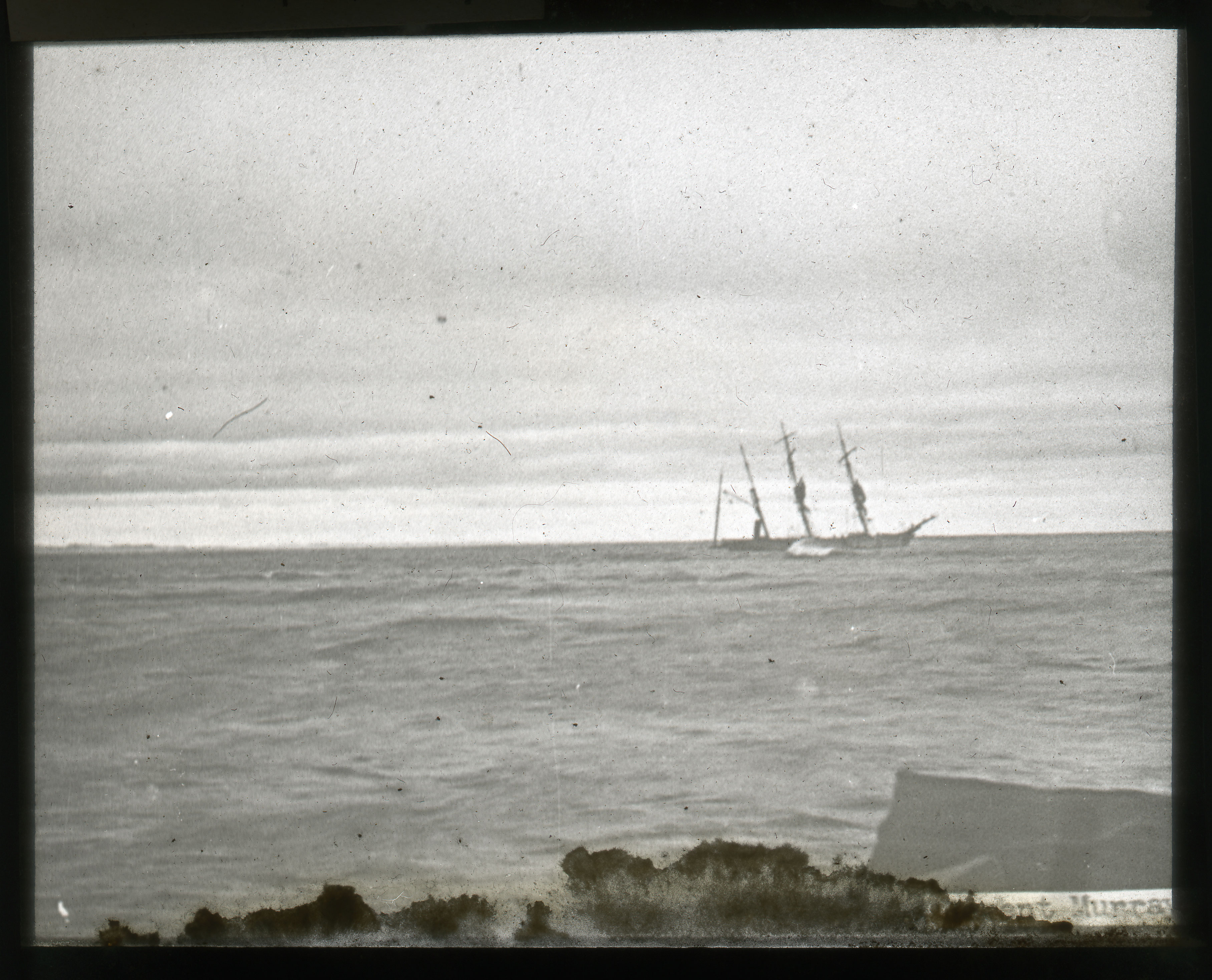
Shipwreck of the Regent Murray, Newcastle Harbour, NSW, 4 April 1899

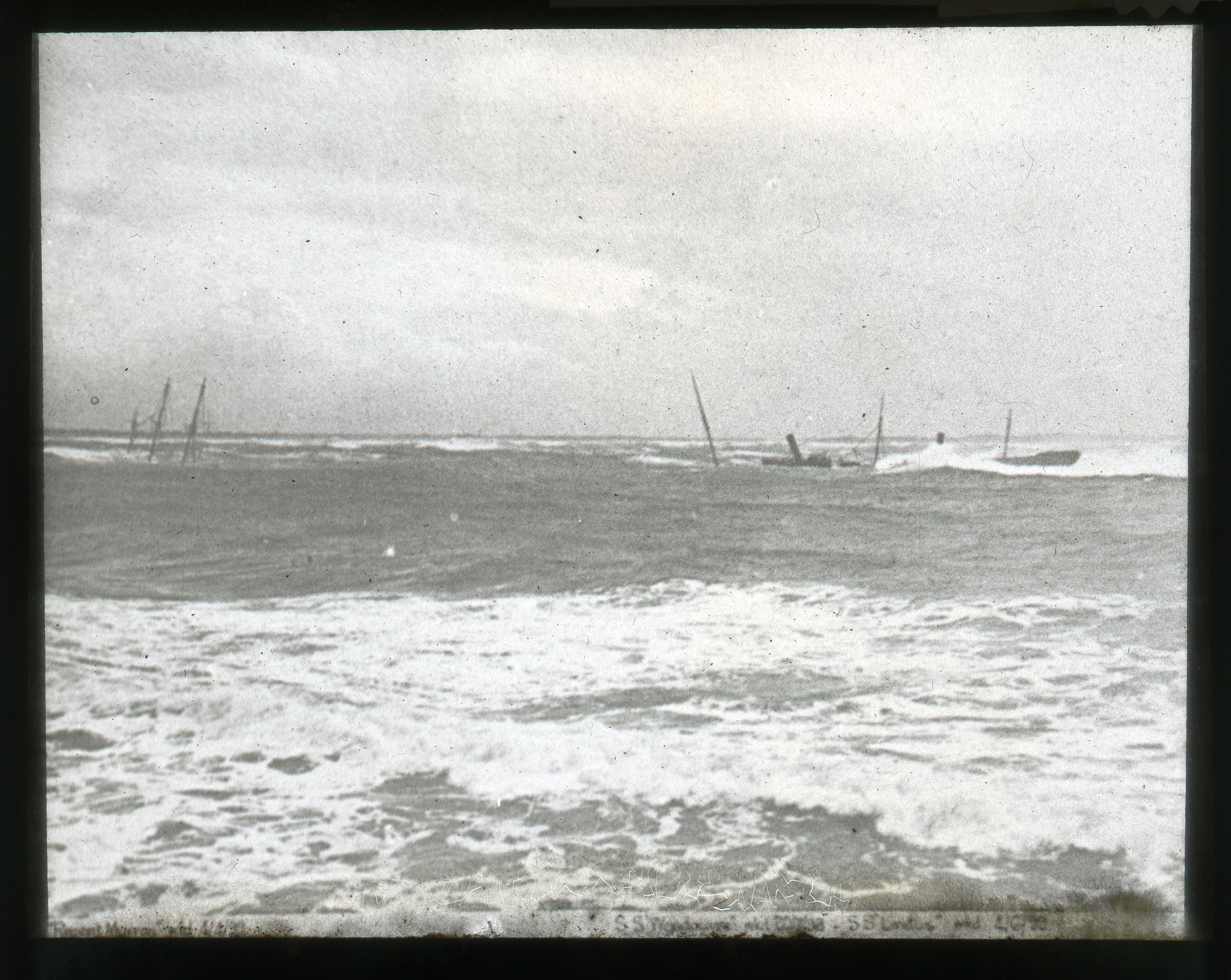
Shipwrecks Regent Murray, Wendouree and Lindus, Newcastle Harbour, NSW, 1899

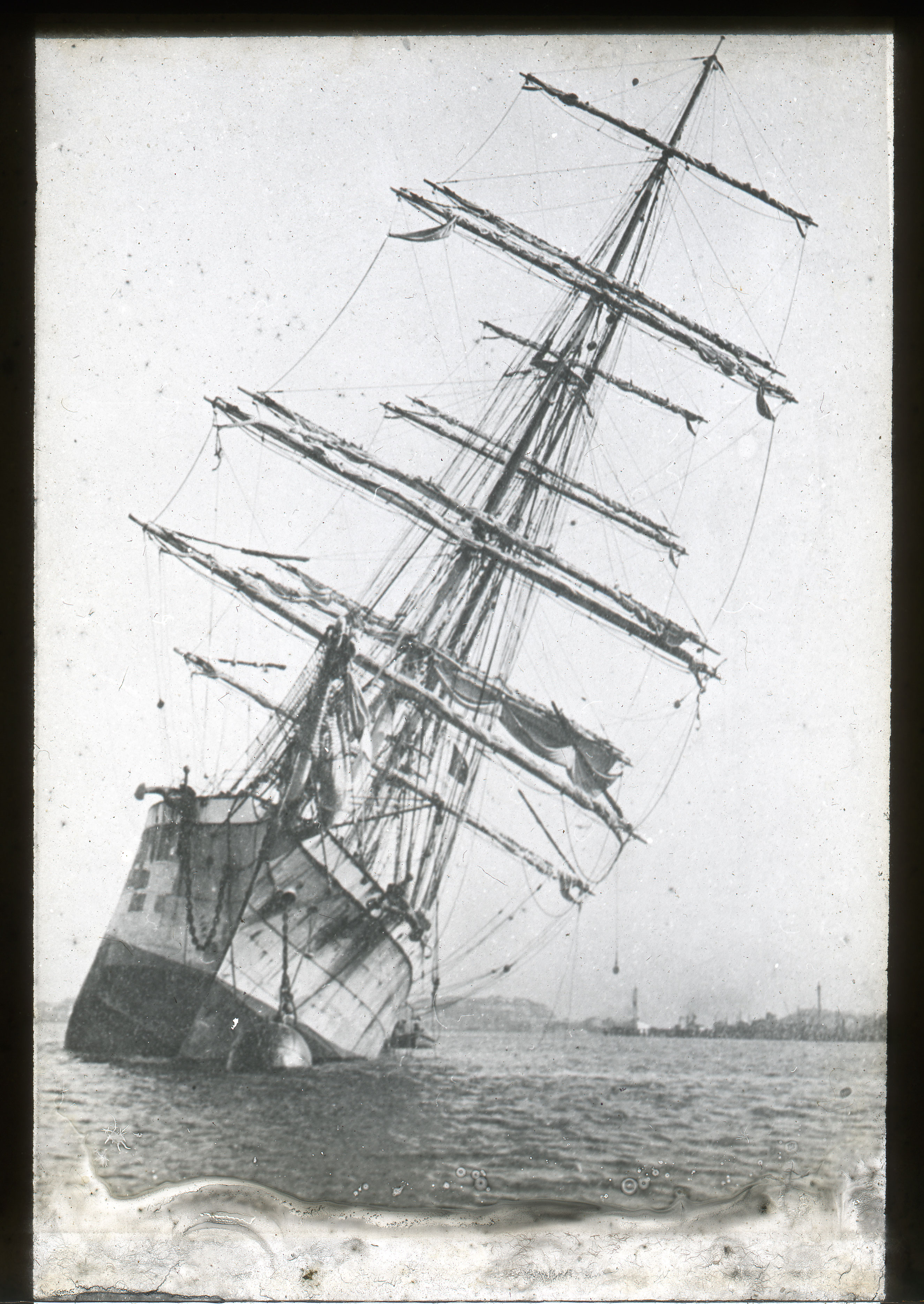
Bretagne in Newcastle Harbour, NSW, 1915

== See also ==
- List of ports in Australia
- Port Darwin another port with a 99-year lease with a Chinese company
