= Granville Harbour =

- Town
- Coordinates: 41°48′00″S 145°00′00″E
- Country: Australia
- State: Tasmania
- Region: North-west and west
- LGA: West Coast
- Location: 35 km (22 mi) NW of Zeehan

Government
  - State electorate: Braddon
  - Federal division: Braddon

Population
  - Total: 27 (2016 census)
- Postcode: 7469
Localities around Granville Harbour
West Coast	West Coast	West Coast
Southern Ocean	Granville Harbour	West Coast
Southern Ocean	West Coast	West Coast

Granville Harbour is a rural locality in the local government area (LGA) of West Coast in the North-west and west LGA region of Tasmania. The locality is about 35 kilometres (22 mi) north-west of the town of Zeehan. The 2016 census recorded a population of 27 for the state suburb of Granville Harbour.

It is located 17.48 km northwest of Trial Harbour, 26.16 km west of Zeehan and 89.31 km south of Arthur River, in the state of Tasmania.

It lies north along the west coast, from the Heemskirk Wind Farm.

The area has been a popular fishing destination for locals and a holiday destination for miners from both Queenstown and Zeehan.

Similar in most respects is the nearby beach and fishing area of Trial Harbour. There are no shops or facilities. Swimming, camping, fishing, sea, bush walking, four-wheel drive or all-terrain vehicle area.

== History ==
Granville Harbour was originally opened up as a soldier settlement after World War I, and also had development proposals after World War II.

In the early 1950s, a Mr. A. Vogel undertook clearing work and fenced several hundred hectares at Granville Harbour. This was used for cattle grazing, and some crop attempts. "Crops of wheat and clover on Tasmania's bleak West Coast are hard to envisage, yet they are to be seen. ACCORDING to reports, Mr. A.Vogel has leased more than 100,000 acres between Zeehan and Corinna with the idea of developing all aspects of mixed farming on a scientific basis. Strips of the button grass plain have been gone over with a rotary hoe and the seed broadcast on the untreated virgin soil. Despite several frosts, both the wheat and the clover appear to be flourishing".

In the early days, cattle were taken to Granville for fattening from parts of the North-West Coast, crossing the Pieman River at Corinna. Once fattened, they were driven overland to mining fields at Zeehan and Queenstown.

Vogel eventually went broke, and the land he developed was acquired eventually by George Smith of Zeehan (originally a piner on the Gordon River, and afterwards a businessman) who kept it going as a grazing property. His grandson Royce Smith currently runs the property. It is now the site of a $280 million wind farm development will comprise 31 turbines with a 112 megawatt capacity. Initial construction works began in August 2018 and the wind farm is expected to generate its first electricity in late 2019. The farm produces some of Australia's highest quality grass fed beef, sustaining up to 1850 head of premium beef cattle. Production of prime beef will continue at the site during the wind farm's construction and operations – effectively diversifying the owner's long-term farming interests.

Archaeological research has also been conducted on Aboriginal middens on the coast between the Trial and Granville area.

Granville Harbour was gazetted as a locality in 1959.

== Geography ==
The waters of the Southern Ocean form the western boundary, and Foster Creek forms the southern.

== Road infrastructure ==
Route C249 (Heemskirk Road) runs along part of the eastern boundary. From there, Granville Harbour Road provides access to the village on the west coast.
