= Hamish Meldrum =

British doctor

Hamish Meldrum (born 1948) is a British doctor who worked as a general practitioner and was Chair of the Council of the British Medical Association (BMA) from 2007 to 2012. He took this role on after being Chair of the BMA's General Practitioners Committee (GPC) from 2004 to 2007.

== Early life ==
Meldrum was born in 1948 in Edinburgh, Scotland. He lived in Aberdeen for seven years, then moved to Stirling where he attended Stirling High School.

== Career ==
Meldrum graduated from Edinburgh Medical School in 1972, then worked as a GP in Yorkshire.

He joined the BMA's General Practitioners Committee (GPC) in 1991. He chaired the GPC from 2004 to 2007.

Meldrum was elected as chair of BMA council in 2007. Among the first issues that he was faced with was the troubled introduction of a new system for junior doctors to be selected for training posts - Medical Training Application Service (MTAS). He spoke out against private finance initiative (PFI) schemes in the NHS, citing waste and inefficiency. In response to the unlawful killing of David Gray by an out-of-hours locum doctor, Meldrum supported the position that practicing doctors should be competent, including having the necessary language skills. He led doctors into industrial action over pension issues. He also spoke out against aspects of Andrew Lansley's Health and Social Care Bill.

In March 2011, Meldrum retired from his practice in Bridlington, East Yorkshire.
