= Mortlake, New South Wales =

Mortlake
- Suburb
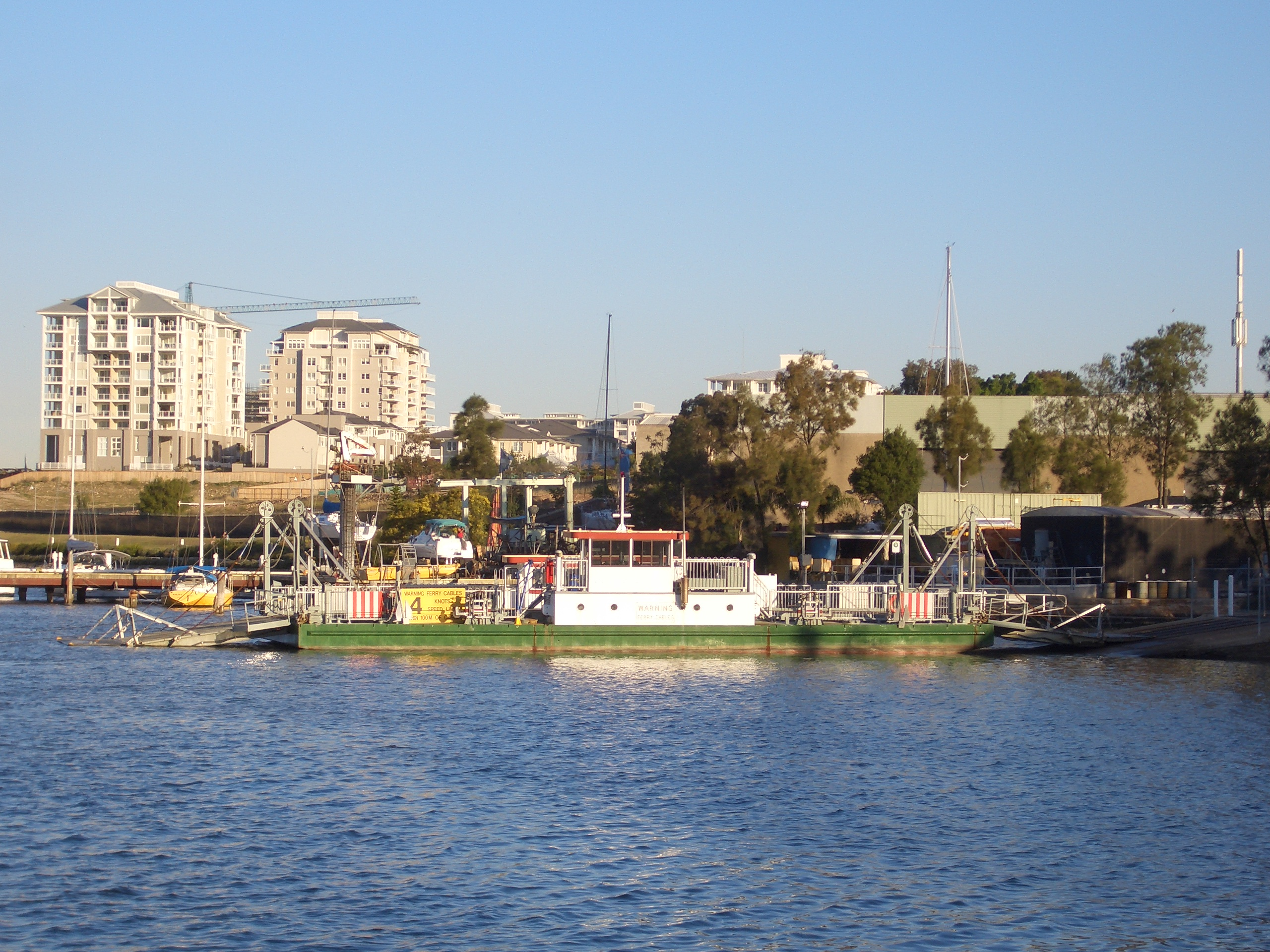
- Mortlake Punt

- Interactive map of Mortlake
- Country: Australia
- State: New South Wales
- City: Sydney
- LGA: City of Canada Bay
- Location: 10 km (6.2 mi) west of Sydney CBD

Government
  - State electorate: Drummoyne
  - Federal division: Reid

Area
  - Total: 0.2 km^{2} (0.077 sq mi)
- Elevation: 14 m (46 ft)

Population
  - Total: 1,954 (2021 census)
  - Density: 9,800/km^{2} (25,000/sq mi)
- Postcode: 2137
Suburbs around Mortlake
Rhodes	Putney	Tennyson Point
Concord West	Mortlake	Breakfast Point
Concord	Concord	Cabarita

Mortlake, originally known as Bottle Point, is a suburb in the Inner West of Sydney, in the state of New South Wales, Australia. It is 10 kilometres west of the Sydney central business district, in the local government area of the City of Canada Bay.

== History ==
The suburb's name is derived from its namesake Mortlake, by the banks of the Thames in London. Parramatta River had been known as the 'Thames of the Antipodes' and other nearby suburbs were also named after Thames localities of Greenwich, Woolwich and Putney.

Mortlake was notable as the site of the Australian Gas Light Company (AGL) gas works, which first purchased land here in 1883. Colliers from Newcastle or Hexham brought coal to the gasworks wharf at Mortlake. When a new Gladesville Bridge was opened in 1964, it was built to replace a bridge that needed to close every time the swing section on the southern end of the bridge had to be opened to permit large vessels to pass through. The gas works closed and the land redeveloped into the Breakfast Point residential development, which since 1993 has been a separate official suburb.

During WWII, the Green Point Naval Boatyard at Mortlake assembled Fairmile B motor launches.

== Transport ==
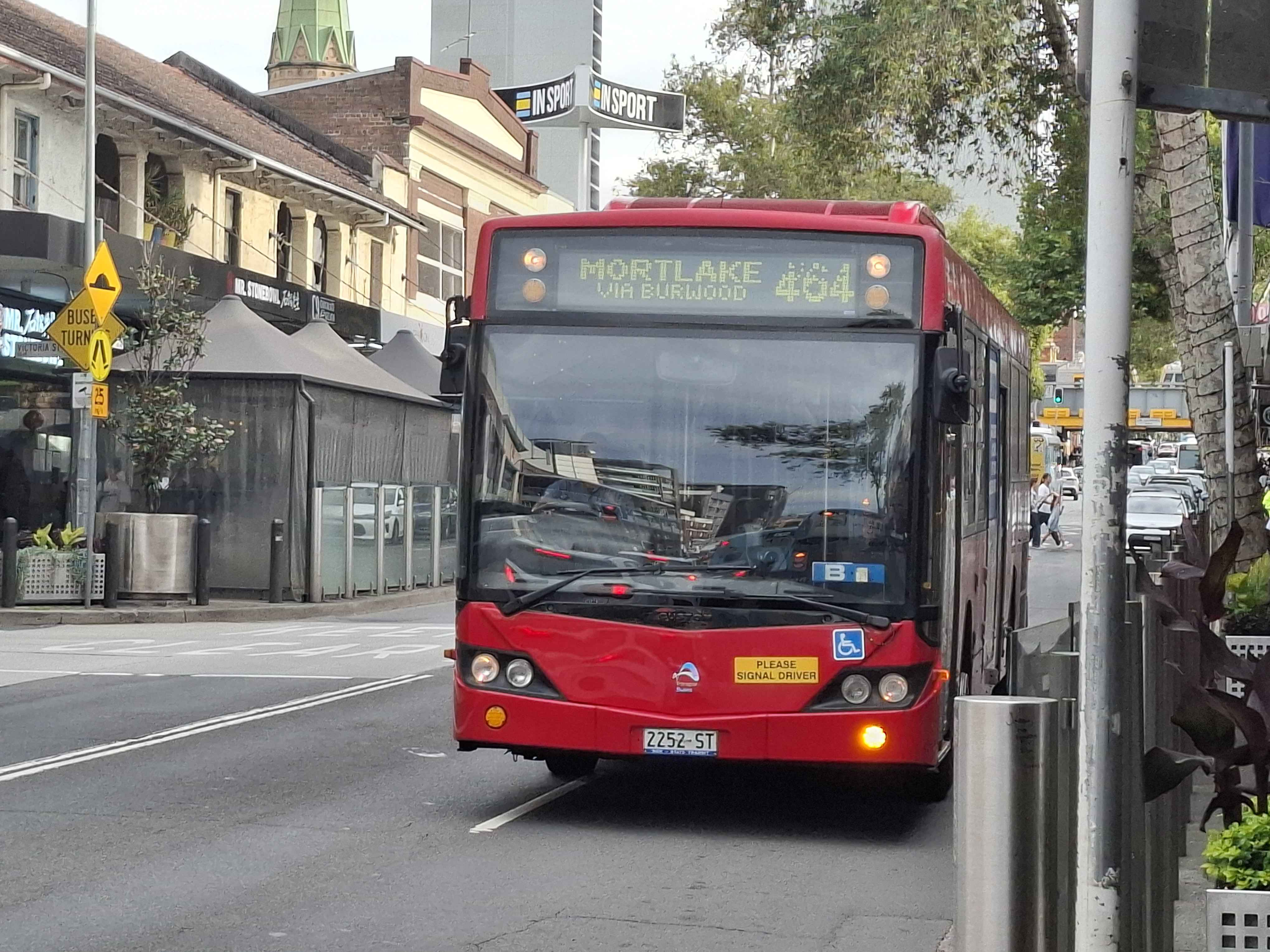
A repurposed Metrobus fleet bus being used for the 464 route, pictured in 2026

Until 1948, an electric tramway connected Mortlake south to the suburbs of Burwood, Enfield and Ashfield.

Mortlake sits on the southern bank of the Parramatta River and is home to the southern bank of the Mortlake Ferry or commonly known as the Putney Punt, the last surviving punt service in Sydney.

Mortlake is also the terminus for bus route 464 (to Ashfield railway station).

The 464 bus route operated by Transport for NSW is notable for beginning on certain days at De La Salle Ashfield and travels to the suburbs of Croydon Park, Burwood, Concord, Breakfast Point and Mortlake. Many students of the former college took this bus route due to it being the only bus route out of large areas of those suburbs.

== Population ==
In the 2016 Census, there were 1,954 people in Mortlake. 57.7% of people were born in Australia and 57.7% of people spoke only English at home. The most common responses for religion were No Religion 32.5% and Catholic 31.7%. The suburb has a Chinese Australian plurality (both ancestral and first generation), mirroring demographics of surrounding suburbs such as Rhodes.

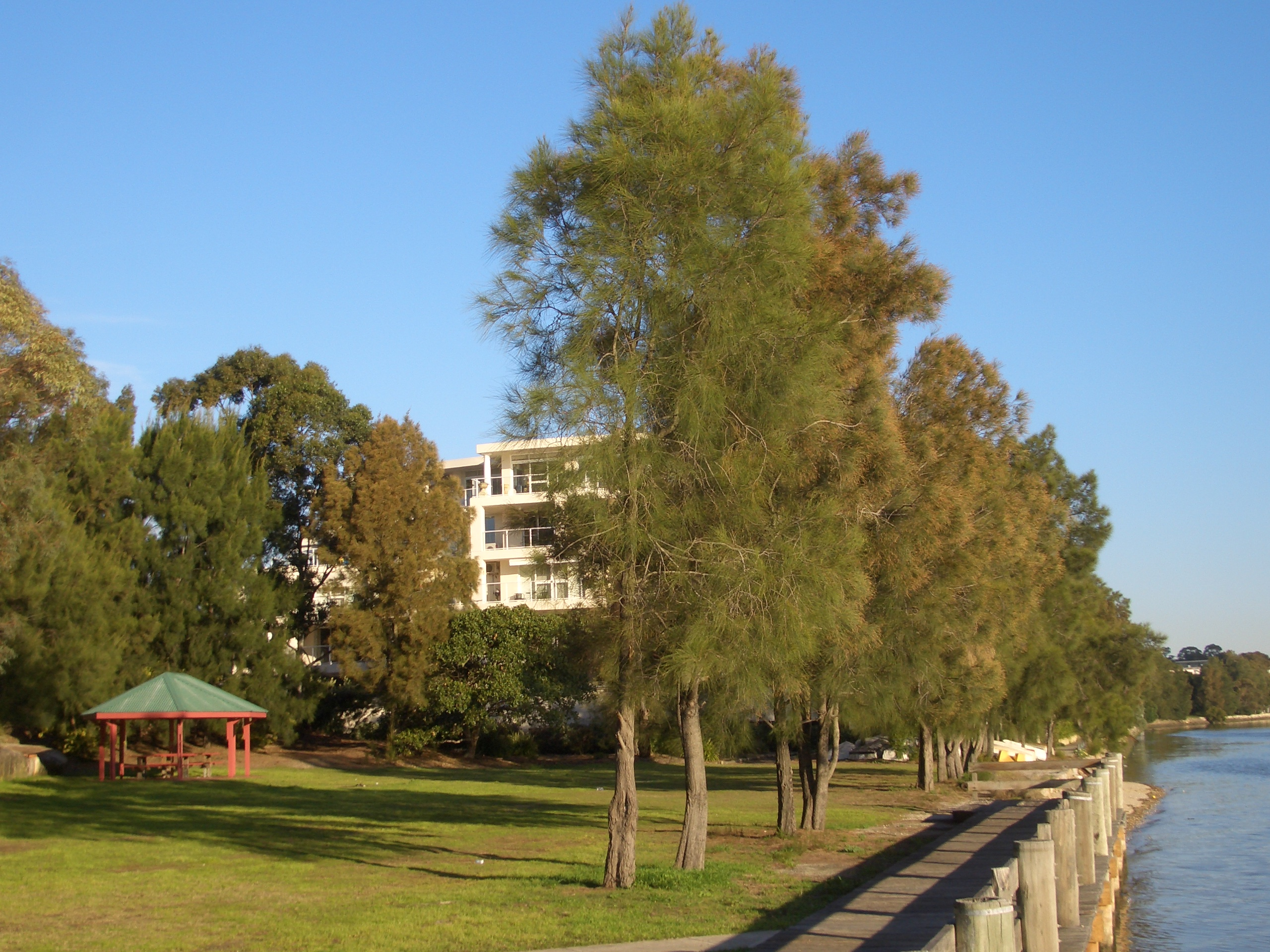
Wangal Reserve

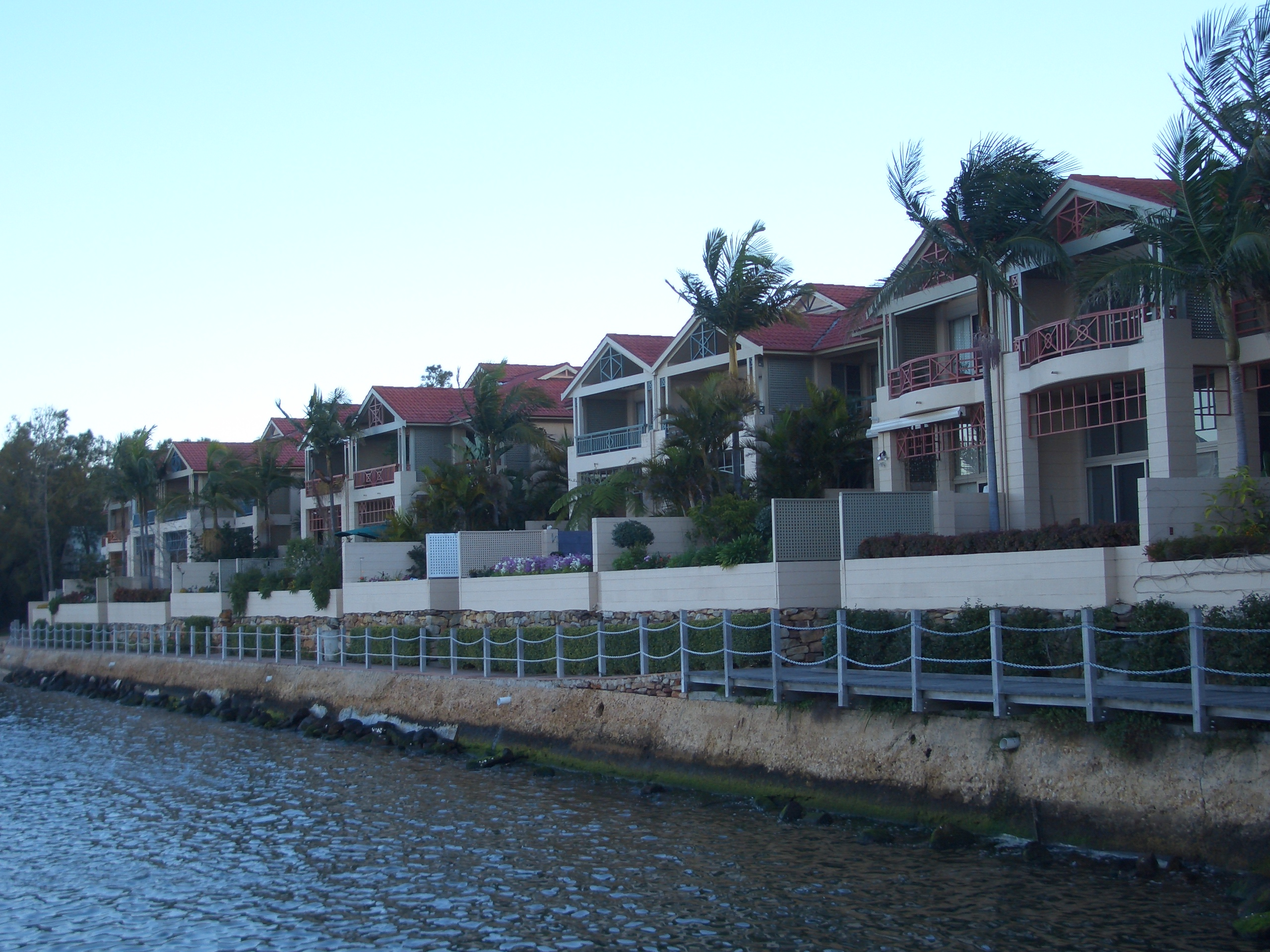
Hilly Street townhouses
