= West Coast Council =

- Local government area
- Interactive map of West Coast Council
- Coordinates: 42.2984°S 145.6289°E
- Country: Australia
- State: Tasmania
- Region: West Coast
- Established: 2 April 1993
- Council seat: Queenstown

Government
  - Mayor: Shane Pitt
  - State electorate: Braddon
  - Federal division: Braddon

Area
  - Total: 9,584 km^{2} (3,700 sq mi)

Population
  - Total: 4,263 (2021)
  - Density: 0.44480/km^{2} (1.15204/sq mi)
- Website: West Coast Council
LGAs around West Coast Council
Circular Head	Waratah-Wynyard	Meander Valley
Southern Ocean	West Coast Council	Central Highlands
Southern Ocean	Southern Ocean	Derwent Valley

West Coast Council is a local government body in Tasmania, covering much of the western region of the state. West Coast is classified as a rural local government area and has a population of 4,167. The major towns and localities of the region include Strahan, Rosebery, Zeehan and the principal town of Queenstown.

== History and attributes ==
The West Coast has a rich mining and railway heritage as well as a historic convict settlement. It is the largest of the 29 Tasmanian councils by area, and the second least densely populated, after the Central Highlands. It takes in the West Coast Range as well as portions of the World Heritage areas.

The region experiences relatively extreme weather conditions, notably high yearly rainfall totals due to frontal systems, especially at Lake Margaret and Mount Read.

West Coast is classified as rural, agricultural and medium (RAM) under the Australian Classification of Local Governments.

=== History ===
Local government in Western Tasmania evolved from locality based councils created in the late nineteenth and twentieth centuries:

Gormanston Municipal Council (1907–1986) - became part of the Lyell Council
Lyell Municipal Council (1986–1993)
Queenstown Municipal Council (1907–1986) - became part of the Lyell Council
Strahan Municipal Council (1907–1993)
Zeehan Municipal Council (1907–1993)

On 2 April 1993, the municipalities of Lyell, Strahan and Zeehan were amalgamated to form the West Coast Council.

Historically the region was more oriented towards the North - due to the main transport being by either rail to Burnie up until the 1950s and 1960s, or by ship out of Strahan until the mid twentieth century. There were no land based transport routes to the south. Consequently, many residents who could afford shopping trips would go to Melbourne in Victoria, rather than Hobart in Tasmania.

Some of the small population is located in the small cluster of towns near Macquarie Harbour - Strahan and Queenstown, these were linked in their connection with the Mount Lyell Mining and Railway Company

While further north Zeehan and Rosebery are settlements that developed from early quite separate mining operations, but were linked by their reliance upon the Emu Bay Railway There a number of ghost towns or abandoned mining communities in the West Coast, with some such as Crotty actually submerged under hydro-electric scheme dams.

== Councillors ==
As of the 2022 Tasmanian Local Government elections, the council consists of the following members:

West Coast Council
Name	Position	Party affiliation
Shane Pitt	Mayor/Councillor	Independent
Robert Butterfield	Deputy Mayor/Councillor	Independent
Kerry Graham	Councillor	Independent
Liz Hamer	Councillor	Independent
Vikki Iwanicki	Councillor	Independent
Dwayne Jordan	Councillor	Independent
Annie McKay	Councillor	Independent
Lindsay Newman	Councillor	Independent
Scott Stringer	Councillor	Independent

== Localities ==
Locality	Census population August 2022	Reason
Zeehan	728	
Rosebery	922	
Strahan	800	Includes Regatta Point
Queenstown	1,975	Includes South Queenstown
South Queenstown		Incl. in Queenstown
Williamsford		Incl. in Granville Harbour
Renison Bell		Incl. in Granville Harbour
Stinger Creek		Incl. in Granville Harbour
Tullah	192	
Trial Harbour	24	
Regatta Point		Incl. in Strahan
Total	4,678	
	0	Variance
Local government total	4,678	Gazetted West Coast local government area

=== Not in above list ===
- Corinna
- Cradle Mountain
- Granville Harbour
- Lake St Clair
- Macquarie Heads
- Southwest
- West Coast

== See also ==
- List of local government areas of Tasmania
