= Corinna, Tasmania =

Corinna Tasmania
- Coordinates: 41°39′03″S 145°04′42″E
- Population: 5 (2021 census)
- Postcode(s): 7321
- Elevation: 24 m (79 ft)
- Location: 138 km (86 mi) SW of Wynyard
- LGA(s): Waratah-Wynyard, Circular Head, West Coast
- Region: North West
- State electorate(s): Braddon
- Federal division(s): Braddon
Localities around Corinna:
West Coast	West Coast	West Coast
West Coast	Corinna	West Coast
West Coast	West Coast	West Coast

Corinna is a rural locality in the local government areas of Waratah-Wynyard, Circular Head and West Coast in the North West region of Tasmania. It is located about 138 kilometres (86 mi) south-west of the town of Wynyard. The 2016 census did not determine a separate population for the town of Corinna, which was included in Waratah. Since 2005, the entirety of Corinna has been leased to Tarkine Wilderness Pty Ltd, which operates it as a wilderness retreat for leisure travellers and groups.

== History ==
The locality was originally known as Royerine. The town of Corinna was proclaimed in 1894, and the locality was gazetted in 1959. Corinna (kurina) is the Aboriginal name for the Pieman River.

== Geography ==
The Pieman River flows through from south-east to south-west, following the south-western boundary. The Savage River flows through from north-east to south-west, where it joins the Pieman. The locality is completely surrounded by the locality of West Coast.

Climate data for Corinna 1961-1990
Month	Jan	Feb	Mar	Apr	May	Jun	Jul	Aug	Sep	Oct	Nov	Dec	Year
Average rainfall mm (inches)	97.0 (3.82)	79.9 (3.15)	108.9 (4.29)	146.8 (5.78)	198.5 (7.81)	204.0 (8.03)	248.3 (9.78)	209.8 (8.26)	182.5 (7.19)	158.1 (6.22)	124.6 (4.91)	140.9 (5.55)	1,875.2 (73.83)
Source: Bureau of Meteorology (Climate Data Online)

== Road infrastructure ==
The C249 route (Norfolk Road / Corinna Road) enters from the north and runs through to the south-east before exiting. Route C247 (Corinna Road) starts at an intersection with route C249 and runs north-east before exiting.

== See also ==
- West Coast geographic region
