= Green Point Naval Boatyard =

The Green Point Naval Boatyard was a shipyard on the southern bank of the Parramatta River at Green Point, Mortlake, Sydney, New South Wales, Australia. During World War II, 20 Fairmile B motor launches were assembled from hulls pre-fabricated in England at the shipyard. For at least part of the time the shipyard was managed by Cecil Boden, who later became well known as a designer.

== Ships built at Green Point Naval Boatyard ==
- ML424
- ML426
- ML427
- ML428
- ML429
- ML430
- ML431
- ML801
- ML802
- ML803
- ML804
- ML805
- ML806
- ML807
- ML808
- ML809
- ML810
- ML811
- ML812
- GPV962 (Walrus)

GPV967 (HMAS Jabiru) Completed April 1946

- GPV968 (Tallarook)
