= Municipality of Gormanston =

Coordinates: 42.0736°S 145.5972°E

Municipality of Gormanston Tasmania
- Established: 1907
- Abolished: 1986
- Council seat: Gormanston
- Region: West Coast
- State electorate(s): Darwin (1909–1955); Braddon (1955–1986)
- Federal division(s): Darwin (until 1955); Braddon (from 1955)
LGAs around Municipality of Gormanston:
Queenstown	Zeehan	Deloraine
Strahan	Municipality of Gormanston	Hamilton
Strahan	Strahan	Esperance

The Municipality of Gormanston was a local government of Tasmania that existed from 1907 until 1986 when it and the Municipality of Queenstown were amalgamated to create the Municipality of Lyell. Lyell was later amalgamated into West Coast Council.

== Council ==
Gormanston Municipal Council met on the second Wednesday of every month at 8 p.m. in the Council Chambers at 11 Peters Street, Gormanston.
