= Municipality of Queenstown =

Coordinates: 42°06′26″S 145°31′59″E

- Local government area
- Country: Australia
- State: Tasmania
- Region: West Coast
- Established: 1907
- Abolished: 1986
- Council seat: Queenstown

Government
  - State electorate: Darwin (1909–1955) Braddon (1955–1986)
  - Federal division: Darwin (until 1955) Braddon (from 1955)
LGAs around Municipality of Queenstown
Zeehan	Zeehan	Zeehan
Strahan	Municipality of Queenstown	Gormanston
Strahan	Gormanston	Gormanston

The Municipality of Queenstown was a local government area of Tasmania, Australia, which existed until 1986 and was governed by the Queenstown Municipal Council. The municipality ceased to exist when it was amalgamated alongside the Municipality of Gormanston to create the Municipality of Lyell.

The municipality included the townships of Queenstown and Lynchford. It was located in the West Coast region and is now a part of the West Coast Council.

== History ==
The Queenstown Town Board, which governed the Town of Queenstown, was a local government authority which existed from 1897 under the Town Boards Act in Queenstown prior to the municipality's proclamation.

The Municipality of Queenstown was one of the many councils either created or reformed by the Local Government Act (1906).

In 1986, the municipalities of Queenstown and Gormanston were amalgamated to create the Municipality of Lyell.

In 1993 Lyell, along with the Zeehan and Strahan, were further amalgamated to create the West Coast Council.

== Council ==
Queenstown Municipal Council

Type
- Type: Unicameral

History
- Founded: 1907
- Disbanded: 1986
- Preceded by: Queenstown Town Board
- Succeeded by: Lyell Municipal Council

Elections
- Voting system: 3 multi-member wards electing a single member at a time via first-past-the-post
- First election: 1907
- Last election: 1984?

== Election results ==
=== 1909 ===
January 1909 North Ward bye-election
Party	Candidate	Votes	%	±%
Independent	J. Wakeford	106	76.8	
Independent	James Campbell	32	23.2	
Total formal votes		138		
Informal votes				
Registered electors		~555		
Turnout				
J. Wakeford gain from E. Dowlings		Swing		

June 1909 North Ward bye-election
Party	Candidate	Votes	%	±%
Independent	Charles Grubb	85	60.7	
Independent	M. Donnelly	40	28.6	
Independent	James Campbell	15	10.7	−12.5
Total formal votes		140		
Informal votes				
Turnout				
Charles Grubb gain from		Swing		

=== 1912 ===
1912 Tasmanian local elections: South Ward
Party	Candidate	Votes	%	±%
Independent	C. Witham			
Independent	Jas. Coxall			
Total formal votes				
Informal votes				
Turnout				
C. Witham hold		Swing		

=== 1913 ===
1913 Tasmanian local elections: North Ward
Party	Candidate	Votes	%	±%
Independent	Cr. M. Donnelly			
Independent	Chas. Grub			
Total formal votes				
Informal votes				
Turnout				

1913 Tasmanian local elections: Central Ward
Party	Candidate	Votes	%	±%
Independent	John Carvel			
Independent	James Sheehan			
Independent	John Fraser			
Independent	George Berry			
Total formal votes				
Informal votes				
Turnout				

1913 Tasmanian local elections: South Ward
Party	Candidate	Votes	%	±%
Independent	Cr. Alfred Webb			
Independent	Joseph Briggs			
Independent	James Campbell			
Total formal votes				
Informal votes				
Turnout				
gain from Alfred Webb		Swing		

1913 Tasmanian local elections: South Ward extraordinary election
Party	Candidate	Votes	%	±%
Independent	Charles Evans			
Independent	Thomas Cook			
Independent	George Phillips			
Independent	James Coxall			
Total formal votes				
Informal votes				
Turnout				
gain from				
