= Municipality of Zeehan =

Municipality of Zeehan Tasmania
- Established: 1907
- Abolished: 1993
- Council seat: Zeehan
- Region: West Coast
- State electorate(s): Zeehan (1907–1909); Darwin (1909–1955); Braddon (1955–1993)
- Federal division(s): Darwin (until 1955); Braddon (from 1955)
LGAs around Municipality of Zeehan:
Circular Head	Waratah	Kentish
Great Australian Bight	Municipality of Zeehan	Deloraine
Strahan	Gormanston	Hamilton

The Municipality of Zeehan was a local government area of Tasmania which existed from 1907 to 1993. It was amalgamated into West Coast Council as a part of a major local government overhaul in 1993.

The Municipality included the towns of Zeehan, Dundas, Rosebery, Mallanna, Granville, Granville Harbour, Corrina, Argenton, Ringville, Tullah, and Trial Harbour.

The original Zeehan Municipal Chambers are now occupied by Ochre Medical Centre Zeehan.

== Council ==
Zeehan Municipal Council

Type
- Type: Parliamentary

History
- Founded: 1907
- Disbanded: 1993
- Succeeded by: West Coast Council

Elections
- First election: 1907
- Last election: 1992

Meeting place
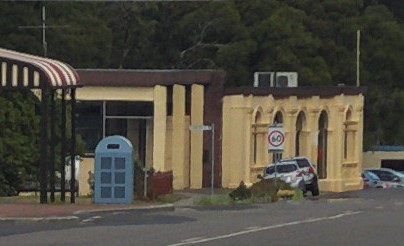
- Zeehan Municipal Chambers

== Election results ==
=== 1912 ===
1912 Tasmanian local elections: West Ward
Party	Candidate	Votes	%	±%
Independent	J. Reynolds (elected 1)	255	48.20	
Independent	Charles Murphy (elected 2)	143	27.03	
Independent	P. W. Johnstone	131	24.76	
Total formal votes		529	98.51	
Informal votes		8	1.49	
Turnout		537		
J. Reynolds hold		Swing		
Charles Murphy gain from		Swing		

1912 Tasmanian local elections: Montagu Ward (Note: Unofficial results)
Party	Candidate	Votes	%	±%
Independent	Connolly	217	76.68	
Independent	Burns	66	23.32	
Total formal votes		283	98.95	
Informal votes		3	1.05	
Turnout		286		

1912 Tasmanian local elections: East Ward
Party	Candidate	Votes	%	±%
Independent	R. W. Maskell (elected unopposed)			
Total formal votes				
Informal votes				
Turnout				
R. W. Maskell hold		Swing		

=== 1913 ===
1913 Tasmanian local elections: West Ward
Party	Candidate	Votes	%	±%
Independent	P. W. Johnstone	203	52.59	+27.83
Independent	Charles Murphy	183	47.41	+20.38
Total formal votes		386		
Informal votes				
Turnout				
P. W. Johnstone gain from Charles Murphy		Swing		

1913 Tasmanian local elections: Montagu Ward
Party	Candidate	Votes	%	±%
Independent	George Barker (elected unopposed)			
Total formal votes				
Informal votes				
Turnout				
George Barker hold		Swing		

1913 Tasmanian local elections: East Ward
Party	Candidate	Votes	%	±%
Independent	Captain W. Fisher (elected unopposed)			
Total formal votes				
Informal votes				
Turnout				
Captain W. Fisher hold		Swing		

=== 1914 ===
1914 Tasmanian local elections: West Ward
Party	Candidate	Votes	%	±%
Independent	W. S. Geard	187	52.09	
Independent	Charles Murphy	172	47.91	+0.5
Total formal votes		359	98.63	
Informal votes		5	1.37	
Turnout		364		
W. S. Geard hold		Swing		

1914 Tasmanian local elections: Montague Ward
Party	Candidate	Votes	%	±%
Independent	G. Dunkley (elected unopposed)			
Total formal votes				
Informal votes				
Turnout				

1914 Tasmanian local elections: East Ward
Party	Candidate	Votes	%	±%
Independent	F. Wathen (elected unopposed)			
Total formal votes				
Informal votes				
Turnout				
