= 1914 Tasmanian local elections =

Local elections in Tasmania, Australia

← 1913	23 April 1914	1915 →

All 53 local government areas in Tasmania

The 1914 Tasmanian local elections were held on 23 April 1914 to elect the councils of all 53 local government areas (LGAs) in Tasmania.

== Propositions ==
=== Scottsdale ===
At the election, in addition to electing councillors, two propositions were put to the electorate of the Municipality of Scottsdale. The first on deciding which day of the week, between Wednesday and Saturday, to observe a Half Holiday, and the second, a non-binding plebiscite on whether or not to borrow £1,500 to build a new public hall in Scottsdale on the condition that the Mechanics' Institute be transferred to the council. The former picked Saturday, and the latter was carried.
