= Trial Harbour =

- Town
- Coordinates: 41°55′46″S 145°10′33″E
- Country: Australia
- State: Tasmania
- Region: North-west and west
- LGA: West Coast
- Location: 20 km (12 mi) SW of Zeehan

Government
  - State electorate: Braddon
  - Federal division: Braddon

Population
  - Total: 24 (2016 census)
- Postcode: 7469
Localities around Trial Harbour
| West Coast | West Coast | West Coast |
| Southern Ocean | Trial Harbour | West Coast |
| Southern Ocean | West Coast | West Coast |

Trial Harbour is a rural locality in the local government area (LGA) of West Coast in the North-west and west LGA region of Tasmania. The locality is about 20 kilometres (12 mi) south-west of the town of Zeehan. The 2016 census recorded a population of 24 for the state suburb of Trial Harbour.

It is a small anchorage on the West Coast, Tasmania and historical locality, located in the northern part of Ocean Beach, Tasmania. It was an exposed and particularly vulnerable anchorage which was susceptible to the prevailing local weather of the Roaring Forties, seventeen miles north of Macquarie Heads (the entrance to Macquarie Harbour).

== History ==
The locality was named Remine until 1987, when it was renamed. Trial Harbour was gazetted as a locality in 1987.

=== Indigenous usage ===
Carvings and middens were identified in the 1930s and 1990s.

=== European usage ===
It was named after the cutter Trial, which first anchored there in 1881, and it was established by four Baltic sailors, Gustav Weber, and the three Karlson brothers, Karl, Peter and Steve, otherwise known as the Russian Finns.

The harbour was utilised for a short while during the establishment of the early mining communities of Zeehan, and Queenstown, prior to the establishment of the settlements and facilities at Strahan and Regatta Point. It came under the control of the Hobart Marine Board.

It had two hotels and other facilities in its early days and currently it is the location of holiday homes.

It has been also a location on the west coast where whales have been sighted close to shore.

Further north along the coast – a similarly dangerous and exposed location was Granville Harbour.

== Geography ==
The waters of the Southern Ocean form the western boundary, and the Little Henty River forms most of the southern.

== Road infrastructure ==
Route C248 (Trial Harbour Road) enters from east and runs through to the west, where it ends.
