= 1646 in art =

Events from the year 1646 in art.

== Events ==
- (unknown)

== Paintings ==
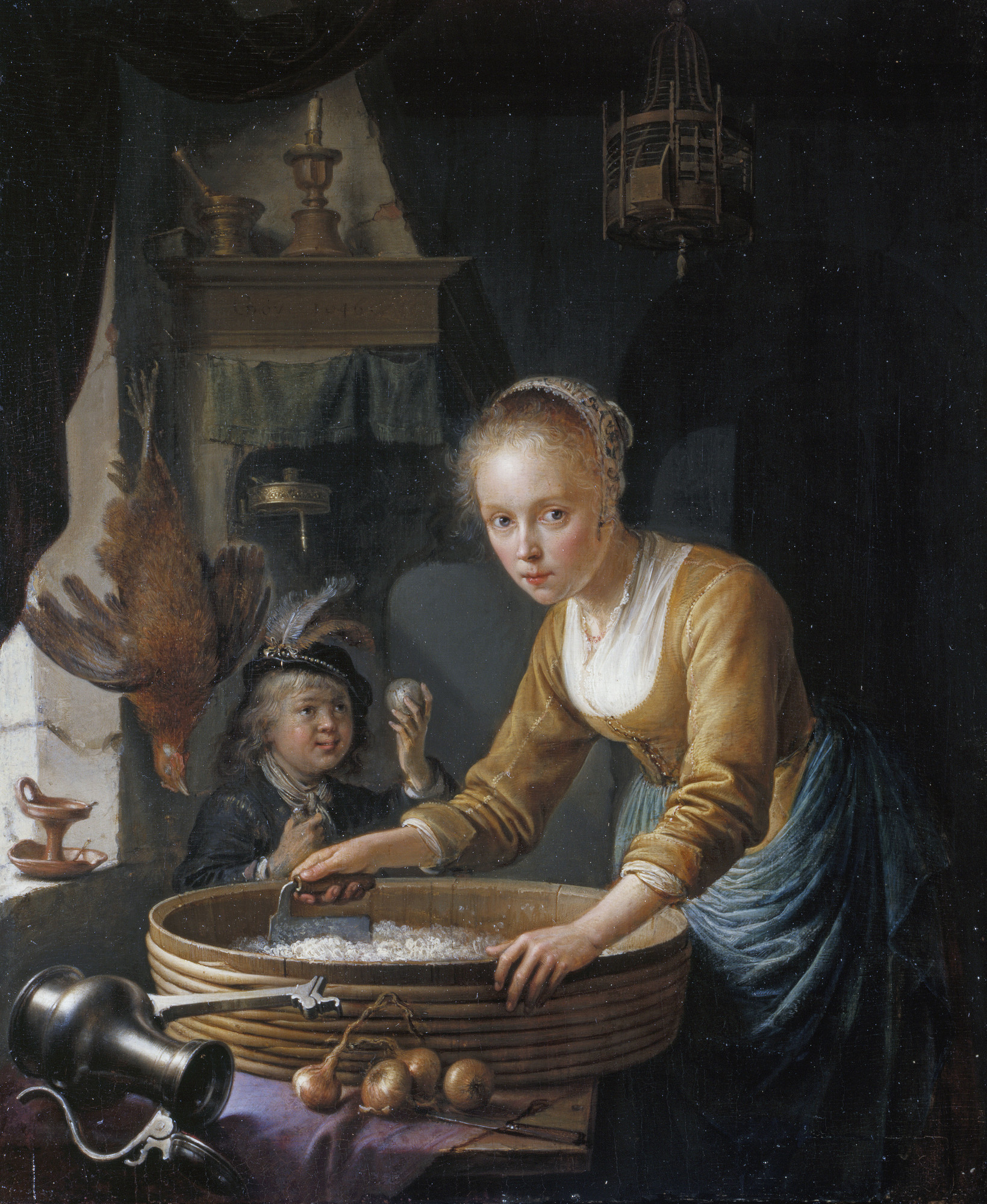
Dou – Girl Chopping Onions, Royal Collection

- Georges de La Tour - The Smoker
- Claude Lorrain
  - The Judgement of Paris (c.1645-46)
  - Landscape with Hagar and the Angel
- Carlo Dolci - Saint Andrew Praying Before his Crucifixion
- Gerrit Dou - Girl Chopping Onions
- Guercino
  - Annunciation
  - The Circumcision
  - Saul Attacking David
- Murillo - The Angels' Kitchen
- Jacob van Ruisdael - Wooded Dunes
- Kano Sansetsu - Old Plum
- Karel Škréta - The Crucifixion (St. Nicholas Church, Prague)
- Philips Wouwerman - Cavalry making a Sortie from a Fort on a Hill

== Births ==
- January 6 - Jan Van Cleef, Flemish painter (died 1716)
- February 10 - Hans Adam Weissenkircher, Austrian Baroque court painter (died 1695)
- April 20 - Giacinto Calandrucci, Italian painter at the studio of Carlo Maratta (died 1707)
- August 8 - Godfrey Kneller, portrait painter in England (died 1723)
- date unknown
  - Andrea Belvedere, Italian painter (died unknown)
  - Lorenzo Bergonzoni, Italian painter (died 1700)
  - Juan Correa, Mexican painter of primarily religious themes (died 1716)
  - Pietro Dandini, Italian painter active in Florence (died 1712)
  - Benoît Farjat, French engraver (died 1724)
  - José García Hidalgo, Spanish Baroque painter (died 1719)
  - Francesco Monti, Italian painter of battle scenes (died 1712)
  - Pietro Paolo Raggi, Italian Caravaggisti painter of Bacchanal and landscape subjects (died 1724)
- probable - Jean-Baptiste Corneille, French painter, etcher, and engraver (died 1695)

== Deaths ==
- April 10 - Santino Solari, Swiss architect and sculptor (born 1576)
- August 19 - Francesco Furini, Italian Baroque painter from Florence (born 1600/1603)
- October 28 (bur.) - William Dobson, English portrait painter (born 1611)
- date unknown
  - Alessandro Albini, Italian painter of the early Baroque period (born 1568)
  - Antonio Bisquert, Spanish painter of the Baroque period (born 1596)
  - Huang Daozhou, Chinese calligrapher, scholar and official of the Ming Dynasty (born 1585)
  - Daniel Dumonstier, French portraitist in crayon (born 1574)
  - Isaack Gilsemans, Dutch merchant and artist (born 1606)
  - Ludovico Lana, Italian painter, mainly active in Modena (born 1597)
  - Niccolo Laniere, Italian painter and engraver (born 1608)
- probable - Giovanni Stefano Marucelli, Italian painter and architect active mainly in Tuscany (born 1586)
