= 1724 in art =

Events from the year 1724 in art.

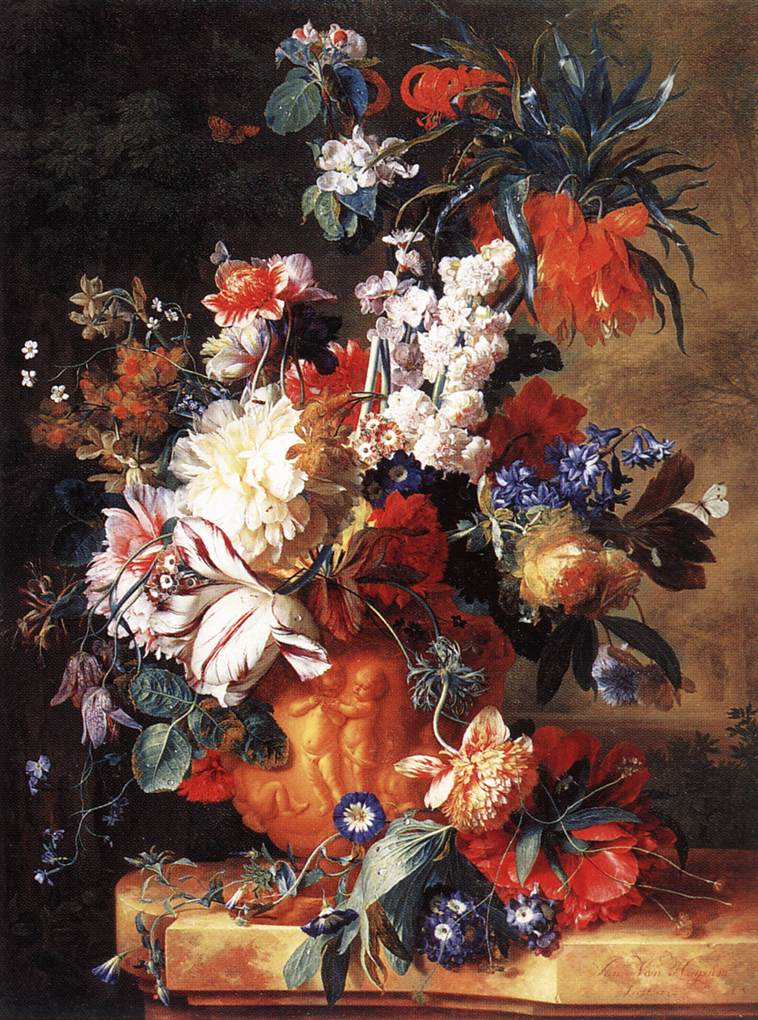
Bouquet of Flowers in an Urn by Jan van Huysum, 1724

== Events ==
- Swiss artist Johann Caspar Füssli goes to Vienna to study painting.
- Charles-Antoine Coypel publishes his illustrations for Don Quixote in a deluxe folio in Paris.

== Paintings ==
- Canaletto
  - Grand Canal, Looking East from the Campo San Vio (Thyssen-Bornemisza Museum, Madrid)
  - Grand Canal, Looking Northeast from Palazo Balbi toward the Rialto Bridge
  - Piazza San Marco
  - Rio dei Mendicanti
- Jan van Huysum – Bouquet of Flowers in an Urn (see image)
- Charles Jervas – Henrietta Howard, Countess of Suffolk
- Sebastiano Ricci
  - Bathsheba in her Bath
  - Repudiation of Agar
  - Solomon adores the idols
- Peter Tillemans – The Thames at Twickenham

== Deaths ==
- January 16 – Per Krafft the Elder, Swedish portrait painter (died 1793)
- April 14 – Gabriel de Saint-Aubin, French draftsman, printmaker, etcher and painter (died 1780)
- June 7 – Franz Anton Maulbertsch, Austrian painter (died 1796)
- August 25 – George Stubbs, British painter, best known for his paintings of horses (died 1806)
- November 19 – Jacobus Buys, Dutch painter and engraver (died 1801)
- December 30 – Louis-Jean-François Lagrenée, French painter (died 1805)
- date unknown
  - Antonio Baratti, Italian engraver (died 1787)
  - Antonio Beltrami, Italian painter active in the late-Baroque and Neoclassic periods (died 1784)
  - Jonas Bergman, Finnish painter (died 1810)
  - Henry Blundell, art collector (died 1810)
  - Benjamin Calau, German portrait painter who used an encaustic technique (died 1783)
  - Ignazio Collino, Italian sculptor (died 1793)
  - Suzuki Harunobu, Japanese woodblock print artist, one of the most famous in the Ukiyo-e style (died 1770)
  - Gustaf Lucander, Finnish painter (died 1805)

== Births ==
- January 12 – Felice Cignani, Italian painter from Bologna (born 1660), son of Carlo Cignani
- February 7 – Hanabusa Itchō, Japanese painter, calligrapher, and haiku poet (born 1652)
- February 23 – Lucas de Valdés, Spanish painter and engraver (born 1661)
- June 17 – Benedetto Luti, Italian painter of pastel portraits (born 1666)
- September 20 – David von Krafft, German-Swedish painter, nephew of David Klöcker Ehrenstrahl and his successor at the Swedish Royal Court (born 1655)
- October 25 - José de Mora, Spanish sculptor (born 1642)
- November 11 – Jakob Bogdani, Slovak still-life painter (born 1660)
- date unknown
  - Ferrante Amendola, Italian historical painter (born 1664)
  - Philippe Bertrand, French sculptor (born 1663)
  - Serafino Brizzi, Italian engraver of the Baroque period (born 1684)
  - Sigismondo Caula, Italian painter (born 1637)
  - Benoît Farjat, French engraver (born 1646)
  - Pietro Paolo Raggi, Italian Caravaggisti painter of Bacchanal and landscape subjects (born 1646)
  - Ezaias Terwesten, Dutch painter (born 1661)
  - Franz Werner von Tamm, German-born, Italian painter (born 1658)
  - Jan Pietersz Zomer, Dutch engraver, copyist, and art collector (born 1641)
