= Aspö =

- Village
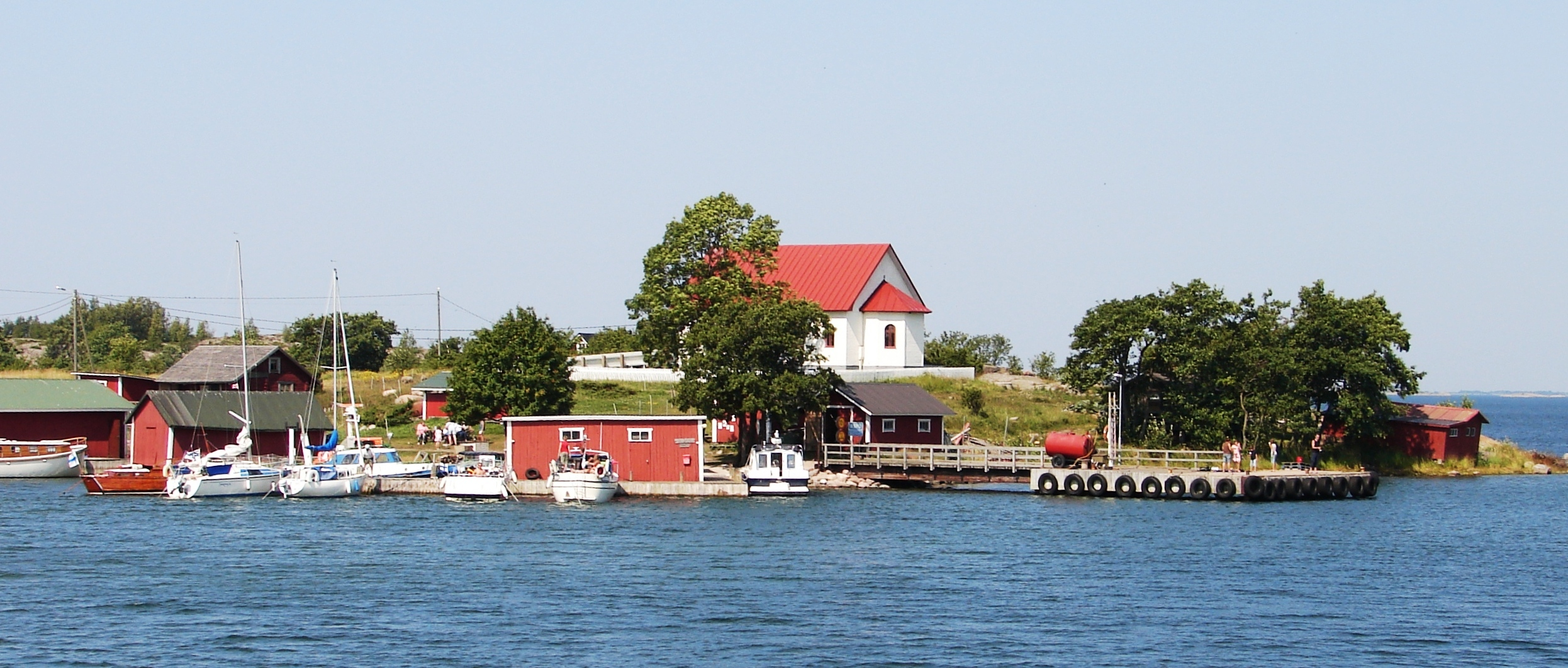
- A view of Aspö from the sea. The white building on the top of the hill is the chapel

- Location within Finland
- Coordinates: 59°57′1″N 21°36′26″E
- Country: Finland
- Region: Southwest Finland
- Municipality: Pargas
- Time zone: UTC+01:00 (CET)
  - Summer (DST): UTC+02:00 (CEST)

Aspö is a small village on the Aspö Island in Pargas, Finland. Until 2009 it belonged to the municipality of Korpo. Its Finnish-language name is Haapasaari, although this name is seldom used. The village is known for its white limestone church that has a red brick roof. The current church was built in 1955–1956; however, a church has existed on the site since the Middle Ages. The old church was destroyed in a storm in 1949.

== History ==
The commercially seafaring Vikings landed on Aspö during the Viking Age, 800 - 1050 AD. In the 13th century it also served as a harbour for traders. The trade route was laid between Tallinn, Estonia and Denmark. In the beginning of the 20th century only about 30 people lived on Aspö. Now there are only about 10 people.

During World War I until 1917, Aspö served as Russian naval military watchpost. In 1944 it served as the German navy base as the Germans were not allowed to anchor on Åland proper.

In the 1910s the Russians had a patrol station on the island. In the 1940s it was used as a harbour for submarines. On the contrary to the year of 1941, on 1944 the Finns allowed instead of Åland proper, the German navy to use only Aspö and Nötö as the naval base Rotbuche as there was a suspicion of the Tanne West operation which would have led to the German occupation of Åland Islands. The question became actual from 20 June to 27 June, when the president of the republic of Finland, mr. Risto Ryti and the foreign minister Joachim von Ribbentrop negotiated the terms continuing the war after the German arms export embargo in since April, 1944 due to the negotiations of peace with the Soviet union. A heavy naval detachment was sent via Utö towards Aspö.

A ship called M/S Utö transports passengers between Aspö and Nagu.

Many men on Aspö work as maritime pilots and the women serve on the tourist branch. As for the tourist attractions there is a new chapel built 1955–1956. The chapel has been built several times since 1696, in the years 1728, 1850 and 1905. Aspö-Eik had played folk music which tradition is taken care of Bruno Johansson and his son Tore Johansson. Milking ended in the 1970s, but afterwards there has been broad for the summer times from 10 to 15 cows for tourists to see.
