= Svea Jansson =

Finnish-Swedish folk singer

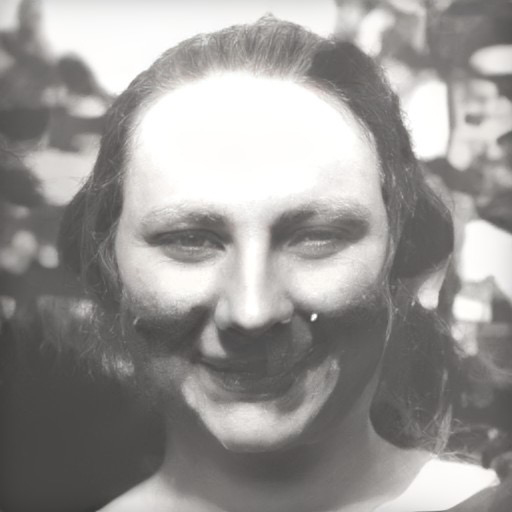
- Svea Jansson at age 18
- Born: Svea Kristina Jansson; 30 September 1904; Nötö, Finland
- Died: 1 December 1980 (aged 76); Skövde, Sweden
- Occupations: Folk singer, bearer of tradition
- Known for: Finnish-Swedish folk song tradition
- Awards: Artur Hazelius Medal in silver (1964)

Svea Kristina Jansson (30 September 1904 – 1 December 1980) was a Finland-Swedish folk singer and bearer of tradition, widely regarded as one of the foremost folk singers in the Nordic countries in modern times. She represented the song tradition of the Åboland archipelago in southwestern Finland and had a repertoire of 1,000–1,200 songs, ranging from medieval ballads to modern popular tunes. Her singing was first documented in 1923.

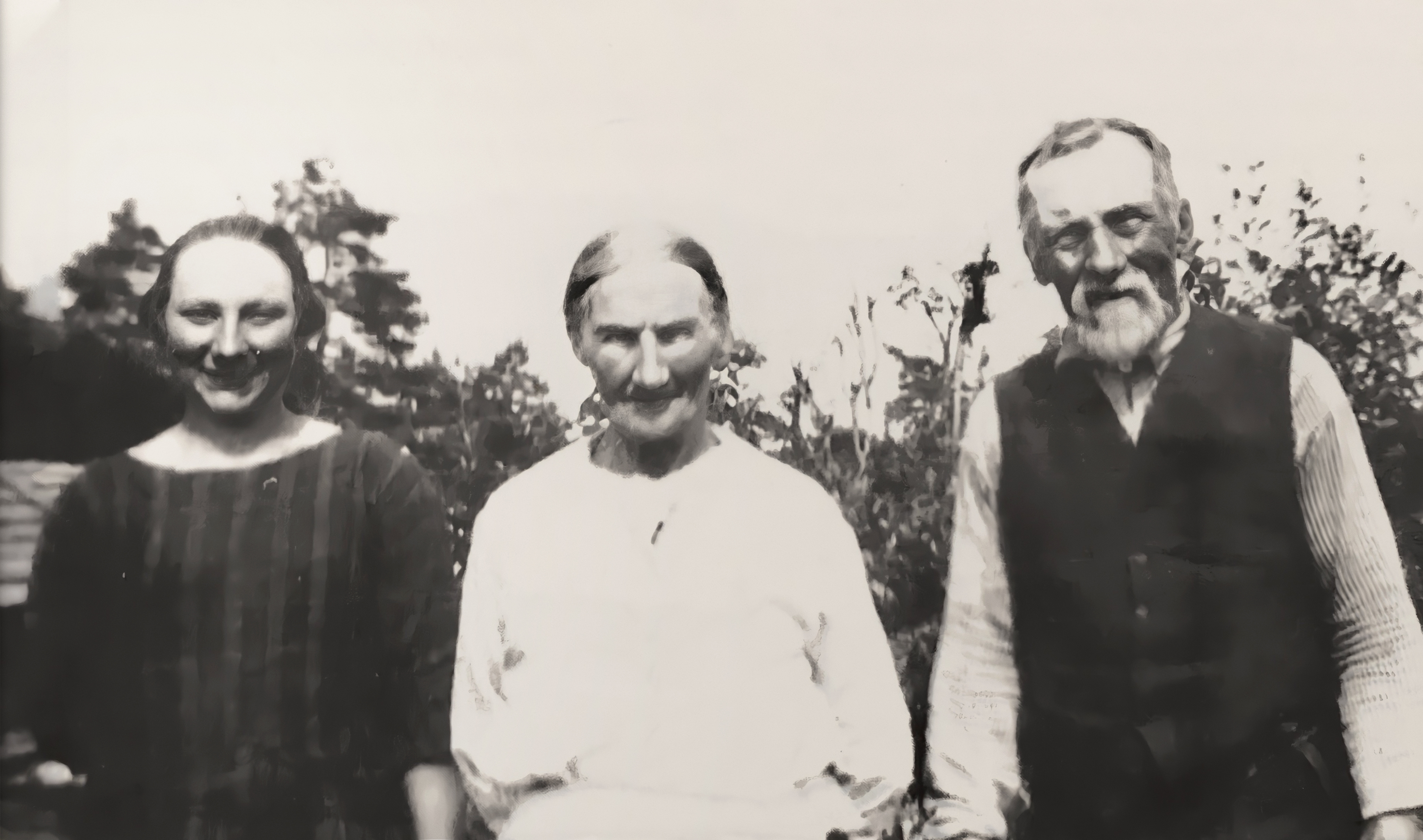
Svea Jansson with her grandparents on Nötö, summer 1923.

== Biography ==
=== Background and early life ===
Jansson was born into a seafaring family on Nötö, a small island community in the Åboland archipelago in what is now southwestern Finland. When she was four years old she went to live with her maternal grandparents in the hamlet of Österäng on Nötö. Her grandmother, Eva Gustava Jansson, was known in the local community as an exceptionally gifted singer with a rich and archaic song repertoire, and it was primarily from her that Svea learned her songs. In Jansson's childhood environment, singing was a natural part of daily life – people sang while working, while rowing or sailing, and together during leisure time.

The folk song researcher Greta Dahlström collected songs from Jansson and her grandmother in 1923–29 on behalf of the Society of Swedish Literature in Finland. During her first visit in the summer of 1923, Dahlström described the 18-year-old Svea in her diary as "musical" with "a brilliant memory", and noted that she already kept large bundles of copied-out songs and poetry.

=== Career ===
In 1939 Jansson made her first commercial recordings on lacquer disc, which were broadcast on Finnish radio. In 1957 she was rediscovered by Sveriges Radio (Swedish public radio) – before Matts Arnberg's recording expedition to Finland, contact with Jansson had been lost, and the Mariehamn police were enlisted to locate everyone with her surname on Åland, where she was believed to be living, before she was finally found in Andersböle, Jomala. In 1959 she moved to Sweden and became affiliated with the Swedish Folk Music Archive (Svenskt visarkiv) in Stockholm.

Her major breakthrough came in 1962 when Sveriges Radio released the record series Den medeltida balladen (The Medieval Ballad), for which Jansson alone provided the recordings on one of the album's four LP records. She became Sweden's most celebrated folk singer, with her songs broadcast on radio and television, and she performed at concerts and academic conferences throughout Scandinavia. In 1964 she was awarded the Artur Hazelius Medal in silver by the Nordic Museum in Stockholm, the museum's distinction for outstanding contributions to the preservation of cultural heritage. That same year she performed at a major concert at the Workers' Educational Association concert hall (ABF-huset) in Stockholm alongside, among others, the American folk singer Tom Paley. She became a Swedish citizen in 1967.

In 1965 Jansson left Stockholm and took a position as housekeeper in Klovsten, Västergötland. She died at Skövde hospital on 1 December 1980, without means, and was buried at the municipality's expense. Her ashes were brought back to Nötö, where her grave is marked by a memorial stone erected by folk music researchers in Finland and Sweden.

=== Repertoire and legacy ===
Jansson had learned many of her songs from her grandmother Eva Gustava Jansson, born 1842, who in turn had learned them from her own grandmother Caisa Eriksdotter, born 1786, making Jansson a direct link to the song tradition of the 18th century through only one intermediary. No song genre was foreign to her – she sang medieval ballads, love songs, sailors' songs, comic songs, children's songs, hymns and religious songs with equal engagement, and she was still learning new songs in the final year of her life. She has become a role model for a number of classically trained folk musicians in Finland and Sweden in the 21st century, and no other folk singer from the Swedish-speaking communities of Finland has achieved a comparable status.

Svea Jansson performing Där växte upp en lilja uti dalen. Recorded by Matts Arnberg in November 1957.
