= Gustaf Lucander =

Finnish painter (1724–1805)

Gustaf Lucander, also Locander (1724–1805) was a Finnish painter.

Lucander was born in Turku, and primarily painted religious-themed works for church commissions. He started off as a secular decoration artist. He painted altarpieces for the church in Nötö (1771) and Piikkiö (1776). He worked on restoring an altar for a church in Huittinen following a fire, which was so thorough that the board can even be seen in his painting.
