= Abel Tasman =

Dutch seafarer, explorer and merchant (1603–1659)

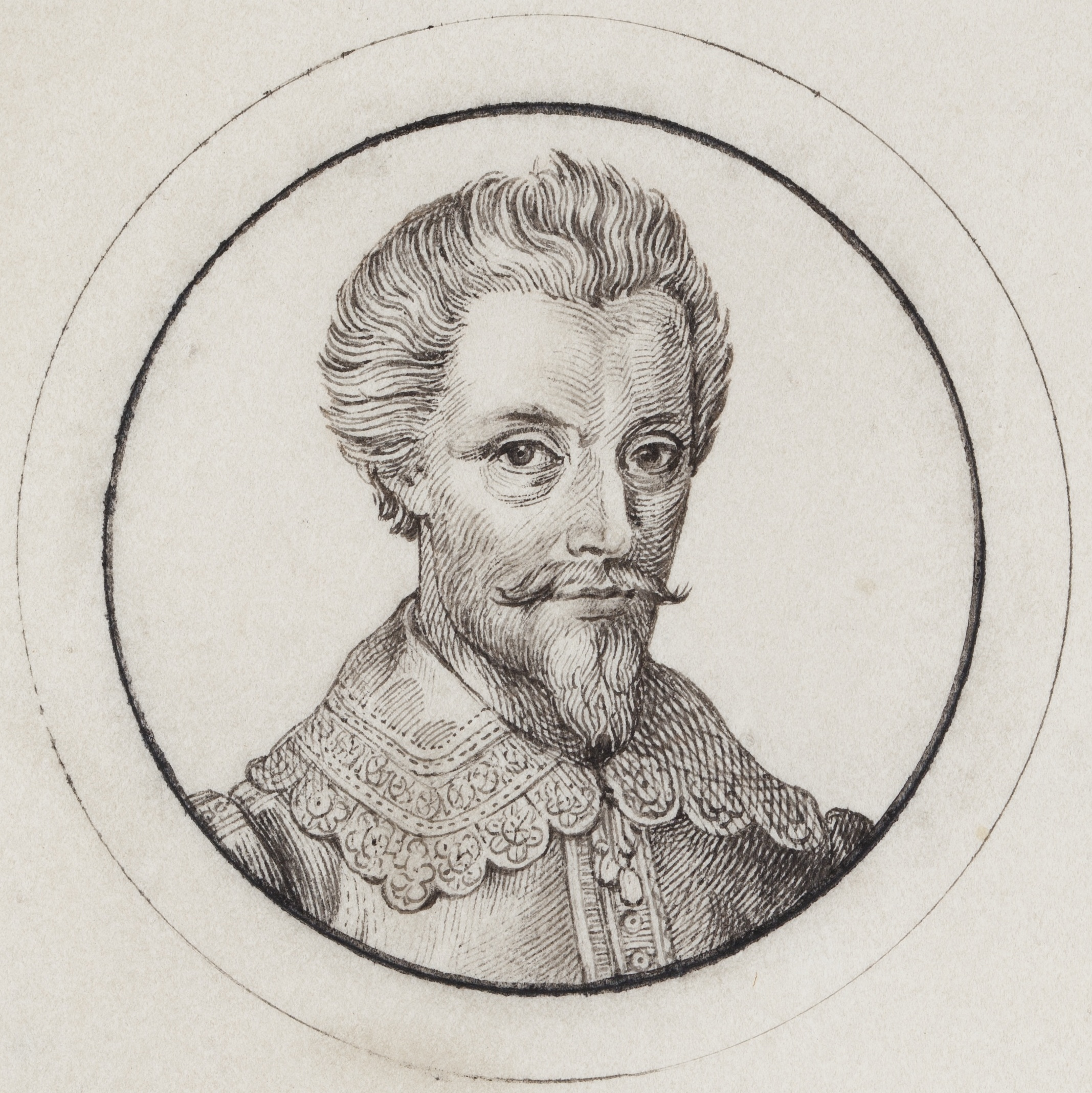
- Drawing depicting Tasman, c. 17th century
- Born: 1603; Lutjegast, Dutch Republic
- Died: 10 October 1659 (aged 55–56); Batavia, Dutch East Indies
- Occupations: Navigator; explorer; sea captain
- Spouses: Claesgie Heyndrix; Jannetje Tjaers (Joanna Tiercx)
- Children: Claesjen Tasman (daughter)

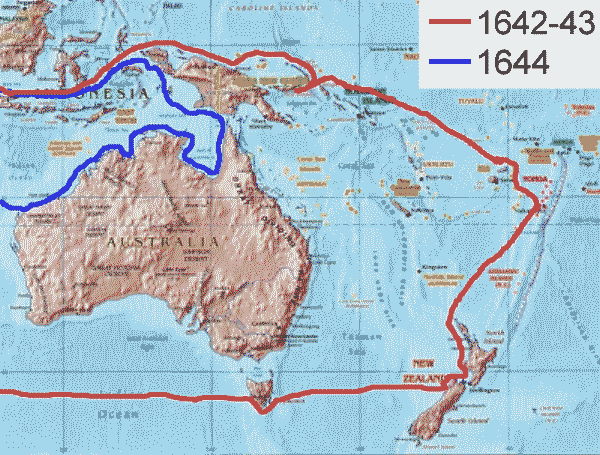
Routes taken by Tasman in the Australasian region, on his first and second voyages

Abel Janszoon Tasman (Dutch: [ˈaːbəl ˈjɑnszoːn ˈtɑsmɑn]; 1603 – 10 October 1659) was a Dutch seafarer and explorer, best known for his voyages of 1642 and 1644 in the service of the Dutch East India Company (VOC). He was the first European to reach New Zealand, which he named Staten Landt. He also discovered and was the eponym of Tasmania.

Likely born in 1602 or 1603 in Lutjegast, Netherlands, Tasman started his career as a merchant seaman and became a skilled navigator. In 1633, he joined the VOC and sailed to Batavia, now Jakarta, Indonesia. He participated in several voyages, including one to Japan. In 1642, Tasman was appointed by the VOC to lead an expedition to explore the uncharted regions of the southern Pacific Ocean. His mission was to discover new trade routes and to establish trade relations with the native inhabitants. After leaving Batavia, Tasman sailed westward to Mauritius, then south to the Roaring Forties, then eastward, and reached the coast of Tasmania, which he named Van Diemen's Land after his patron, Anthony van Diemen. He then sailed northeast, and was the first European to discover the west coast of New Zealand, which he named Staten Landt. It was later renamed Nieuw Zeeland, after the Dutch province of Zeeland, by Joan Blaeu, official Dutch cartographer to the Dutch East India Company.

Despite his achievements, Tasman's expedition was not entirely successful. The encounter with the Māori people on the South Island of New Zealand resulted in a violent confrontation, which left four of Tasman's men dead. He returned to Batavia without having made any significant contact with the native inhabitants or establishing any trade relations. Tasman continued to serve the Dutch East India Company until his death in 1659.

More than a century later, knowledge from Tasman's expeditions was used by James Cook, leading to exploration and colonization of Australia and New Zealand by the British.

== Biography ==
=== Early life ===
Abel Tasman was likely born in 1602 or 1603 in Lutjegast, a village in the province of Groningen. He married Claesgie Heyndrix, with whom he had a daughter named Claesjen. A proclamation of his second marriage, given in December 1631 at Amsterdam, describes him as a widower and sailor. On 27 December 1631 as a 28-year old seafarer living in Amsterdam, he married 21-year-old Jannetje Tjaers, of Palmstraat in Amsterdam.

=== Relocation to the Dutch East Indies ===
Uneducated, but employed by the Dutch East India Company (VOC), Tasman learned navigation and seamanship on the job. In 1632, when he married Jannetje Tjaers, he was an ordinary seaman. In February 1634 he was promoted to seaman first class, and, in May 1634, was appointed skipper of the Mocha shortly after.

In 1633, Tasman sailed from Texel in the Netherlands to Batavia (now Jakarta), using the southern Brouwer Route. While based in Batavia, he later joined a voyage to Seram Island, in what is now Indonesia's Maluku Province. The expedition was sent after local traders sold spices to European merchants other than the Dutch. Tasman docked to find wood for repairs and was separated from the other ships; a fight broke out with local villagers and at least two of Tasman's men were killed.

In 1634, freshly appointed as skipper, he went on a two-year voyage to the Maluku Islands under the command of Frans Valck.

By August 1637, Tasman had returned to Amsterdam, and in 1638 he signed on for another ten years and took his wife with him to Batavia via a six-month journey. On 25 March 1638, he tried to sell his property in the Jordaan, but the purchase was cancelled.

He was second-in-command of a 1639 expedition of exploration into the north Pacific under Matthijs Quast. The fleet included the ships Engel and Gracht and reached Fort Zeelandia (Dutch Formosa) and Deshima (an artificial island off Nagasaki, Japan).

=== First major voyage ===
In August 1642, the Council of the Indies, consisting of Antonie van Diemen, Cornelis van der Lijn, Joan Maetsuycker, Justus Schouten, Salomon Sweers, Cornelis Witsen, and Pieter Boreel in Batavia dispatched Tasman and cartographer Frans Jacobszoon Visscher on a voyage of exploration to little-charted areas east of the Cape of Good Hope, west of Staten Land (near the Cape Horn of South America) and south of the Solomon Islands.

One of the objectives was to obtain knowledge of "all the totally unknown" Provinces of Beach. This was a purported yet phantom island said to have plentiful gold, which had appeared on European maps since the 15th century, as a result of an error in some editions of Marco Polo's works. The expedition was to use two small ships, Heemskerck and Zeehaen.

==== Mauritius ====
Tasman sailed from Batavia on 14 August 1642 and reached Mauritius 22 days later, on 5 September 1642, according to the captain's journal. On the island there was fresh water, timber for repairs, and the crew could be well fed. Tasman also received assistance from the governor, Adriaan van der Stel.

Mauritius was chosen as a turning point because of the prevailing winds. After staying just over four weeks, the two ships, Heemskerck and Zeehaen, left on 8 October and entered the Roaring Forties to make a fast eastward crossing. At the time, no expedition had sailed this far east. Pieter Nuyts had come closest, reaching a similar point about 15 years earlier, in 1626–27.

On 7 November, nearly a month into the crossing, snow and hail forced the ship's council to change course to the northeast, aiming instead for the Solomon Islands.

==== Tasmania ====
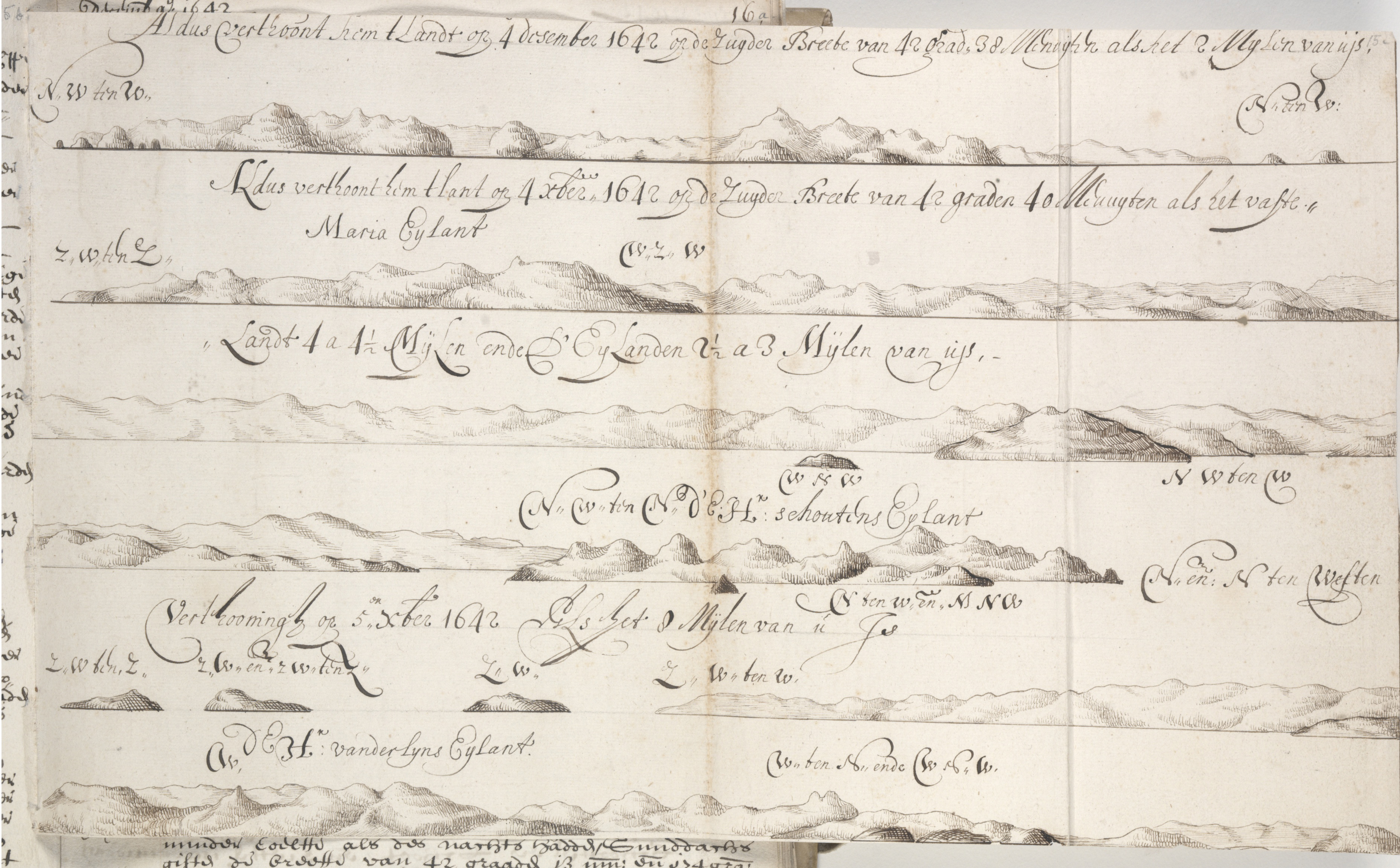
Coastal drawings of Tasmania, Huijdecoper journal of Abel Tasman, Hessel Gerritsz, 1642

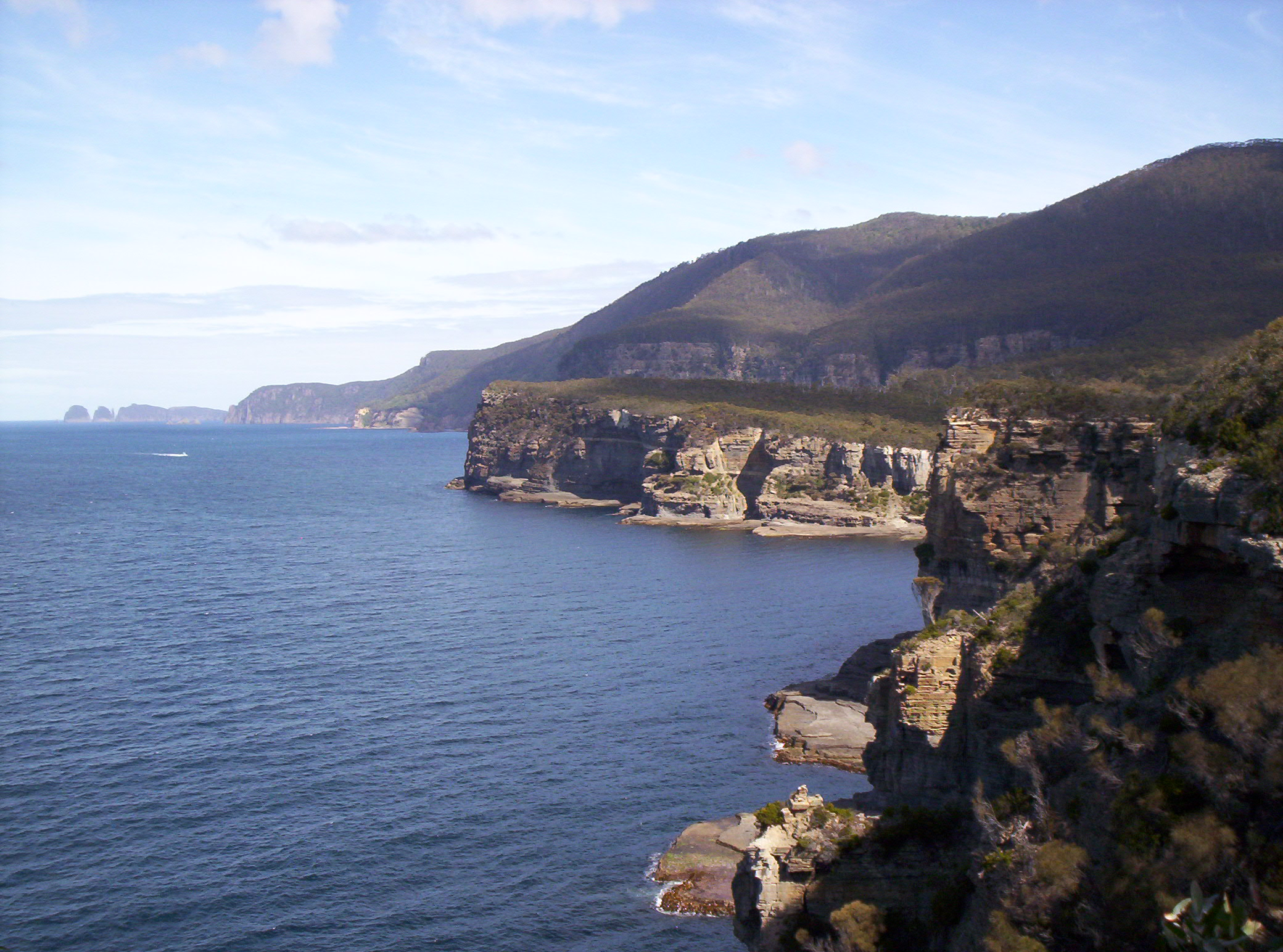
Coastal cliffs of Tasman Peninsula

On 24 November 1642, Tasman reached and sighted the west coast of Tasmania, north of Macquarie Harbour. He named his discovery Van Diemen's Land, after Antonio van Diemen, Governor-General of the Dutch East Indies.

He tried to work his two ships into Adventure Bay on the east coast of South Bruny Island, but he was blown out to sea by a storm. This area he named Storm Bay. Two days later, on 1 December, Tasman anchored to the north of Cape Frederick Hendrick just north of the Forestier Peninsula. On 2 December, two ship's boats under the command of the Pilot, Major Visscher, rowed through the Marion Narrows into Blackman Bay, and then west to the outflow of Boomer Creek where they gathered some edible "greens". Tasman named the bay, Frederick Hendrik Bay, which included the present North Bay, Marion Bay and what is now Blackman Bay. (Tasman's original naming, Frederick Henrick Bay, was mistakenly transferred to its present location by Marion Dufresne in 1772). Tasman formally claimed the land on 3 December 1642.

For two more days, he continued to follow the east coast northward to see how far it went. When the land veered to the north-west at Eddystone Point, he tried to follow the coast line but his ships were suddenly hit by the Roaring Forties howling through Bass Strait. Tasman was on a mission to find the Southern Continent not more islands, so he abruptly turned away to the east and continued his continent-hunting.

==== New Zealand ====
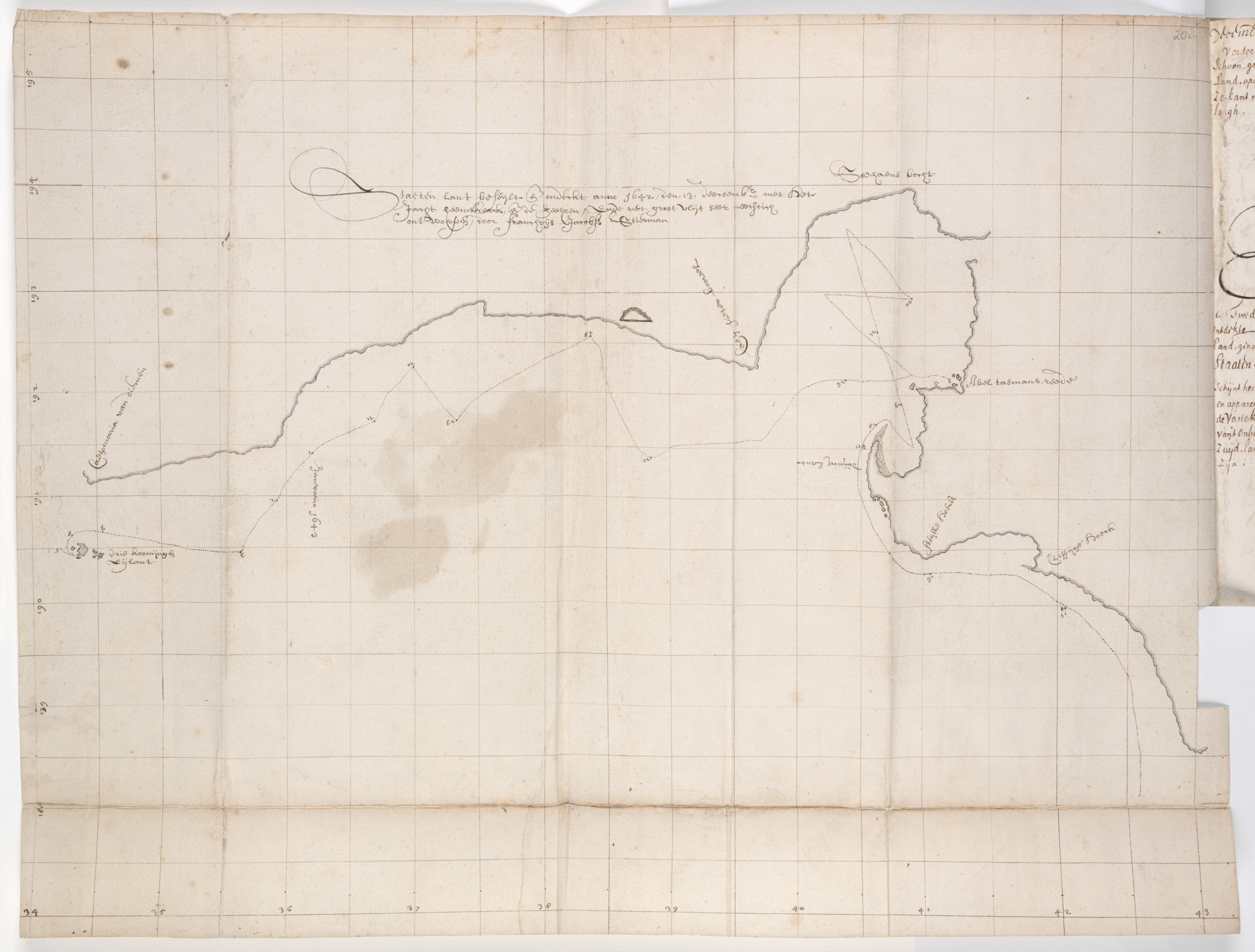
Chart, NE coast of the South Island, New Zealand, Huijdecoper journal of Abel Tasman, Hessel Gerritsz, 1643

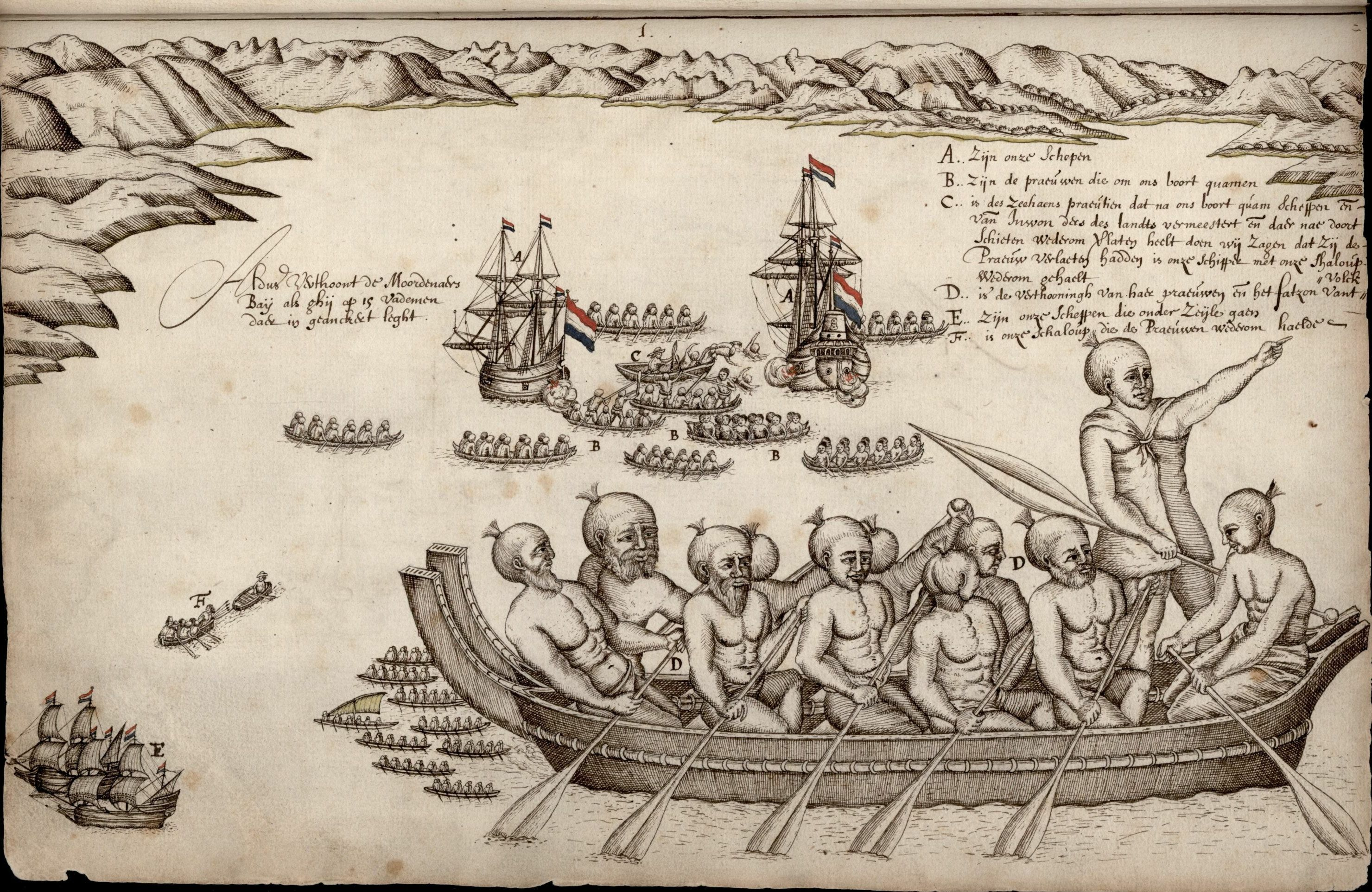
Murderers' Bay, drawing by Isaack Gilsemans

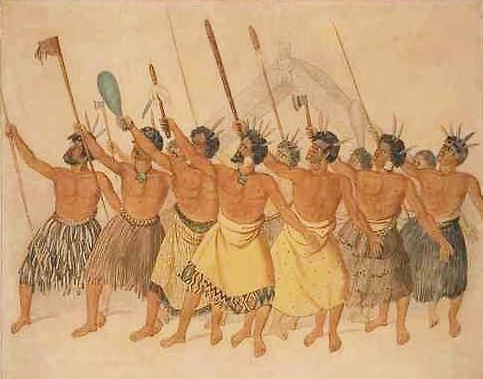
Māori haka

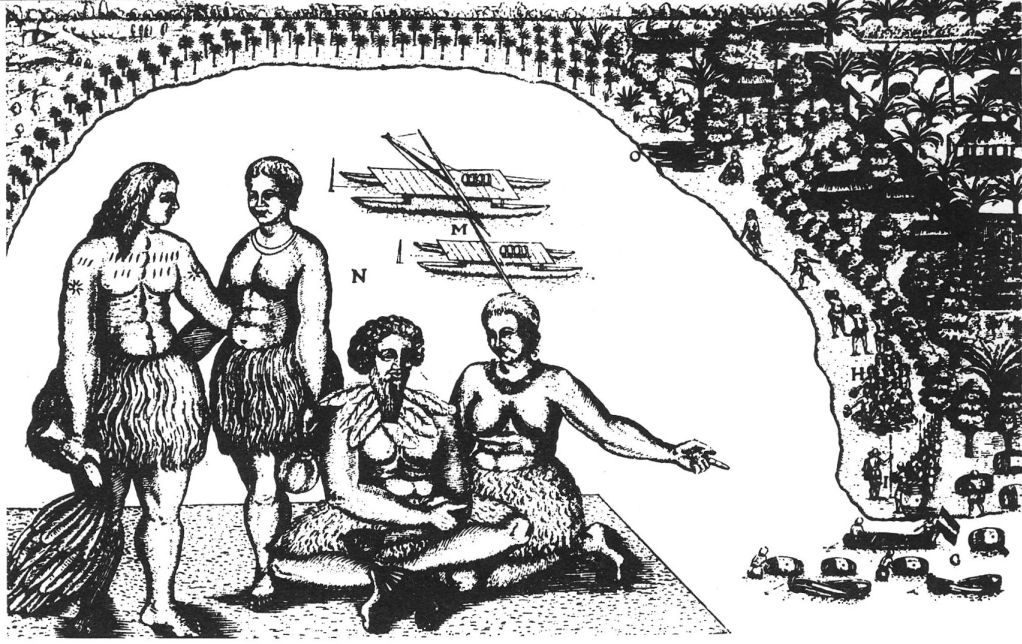
Tongatapu, the main island of Tonga; drawing by Isaack Gilsemans

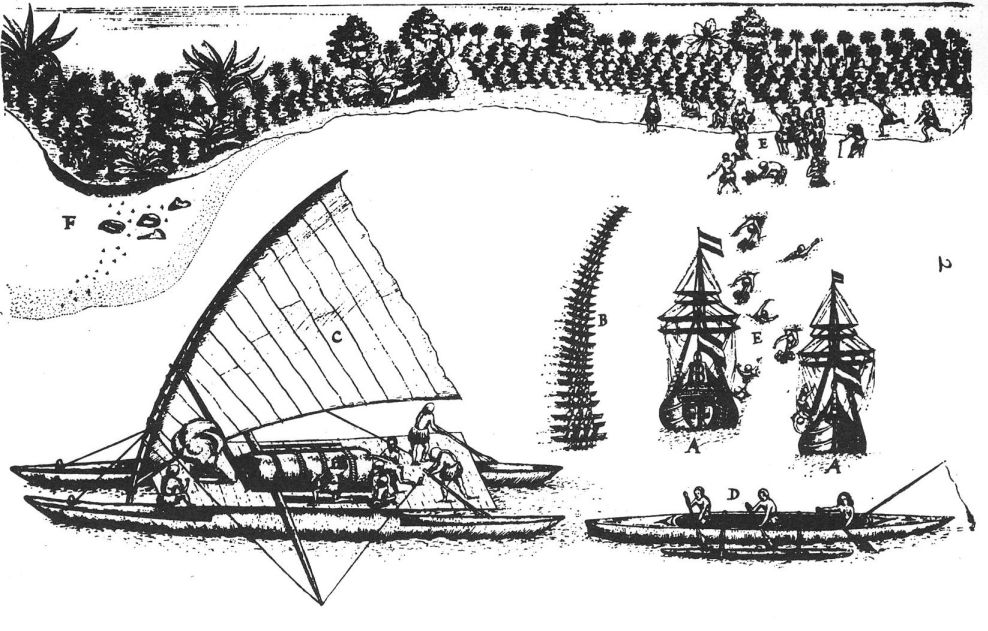
The bay of Tongatapu with the two ships; drawing by Isaack Gilsemans

The expedition endured a rough voyage and in one of his diary entries Tasman claimed that his compass was the only thing that had kept him alive.

On 13 December 1642 Tasman and his crew became the first Europeans to reach New Zealand when they sighted the north-west coast of the South Island. Tasman named it Staten Landt "in honour of the States General" (Dutch parliament). He wrote, "it is possible that this land joins to the Staten Landt but it is uncertain", referring to Isla de los Estados, a landmass of the same name at the southern tip of South America, encountered by the Dutch navigator Jacob Le Maire in 1616. However, in 1643 Brouwer's expedition to Valdivia found out that Staaten Landt was separated by sea from the hypothetical Southern Land. Tasman continued: "We believe that this is the mainland coast of the unknown Southland." Tasman thought he had found the western side of the long-imagined Terra Australis that stretched across the Pacific to near the southern tip of South America. On 14 December 1642, Tasman's ships anchored 7 km offshore c. 20km south of Cape Foulwind near Greymouth. The ships were observed by Māori who named a place on this coast Tiropahi (the place were a large sailing ship was seen).

After sailing north then east for five days, the expedition anchored about 7 kilometres (4.3 mi) from the coast off what is now Golden Bay. A group of Māori paddled out in a waka (canoe) and attacked some sailors who were rowing between the two Dutch vessels. Four sailors were clubbed to death with patu.

In the evening about one hour after sunset we saw many lights on land and four vessels near the shore, two of which betook themselves towards us. When our two boats returned to the ships reporting that they had found not less than thirteen fathoms of water, and with the sinking of the sun (which sank behind the high land) they had been still about half a mile from the shore. After our people had been on board about one glass, people in the two canoes began to call out to us in gruff, hollow voices. We could not in the least understand any of it; however, when they called out again several times we called back to them as a token answer. But they did not come nearer than a stone's shot. They also blew many times on an instrument, which produced a sound like the moors' trumpets. We had one of our sailors (who could play somewhat on the trumpet) play some tunes to them in answer."

As Tasman sailed out of the bay he observed 22 waka near the shore, of which "eleven swarming with people came off towards us". The waka approached the Zeehaen, which fired and hit a man in the largest waka holding a small white flag. Canister shot also hit the side of a waka. Archaeologist Ian Barber suggests that local Māori were trying to secure a cultivation field under ritual protection (tapu) where they believed the Dutch were attempting to land. December was at the mid-point of the locally important sweet potato/kūmara (Ipomoea batatas) growing season. Tasman named the area "Murderers' Bay".

The expedition then sailed north, sighting Cook Strait, which separates the north and south islands of New Zealand, and which it mistook for a bight and named "Zeehaen's Bight". Two names that the expedition gave to landmarks in the far north of New Zealand still endure: Cape Maria van Diemen and Three Kings Islands. (Kaap Pieter Boreels was renamed Cape Egmont by Captain James Cook 125 years later.)

==== Return voyage ====
En route back to Batavia, Tasman came across the Tongan archipelago on 20 January 1643. While passing the Fiji Islands Tasman's ships came close to being wrecked on the dangerous reefs of the northeastern part of the Fiji group. He charted the eastern tip of Vanua Levu and Cikobia-i-Lau before making his way back into the open sea. The expedition turned north-west towards New Guinea and arrived back in Batavia on 15 June 1643.

=== Second major voyage ===
Tasman left Batavia on 30 January 1644 on his second voyage with three ships: Limmen, Zeemeeuw and the tender Braek. He followed the south coast of New Guinea eastwards in an attempt to find a passage to the eastern side of New Holland. However, he missed the Torres Strait between New Guinea and Australia and continued his voyage by following the shore of the Gulf of Carpentaria westwards along the north Australian coast. He mapped the north coast of Australia, making observations on New Holland and its people. He arrived back in Batavia about seven months later, in August 1644.

From the point of view of the Dutch East India Company, Tasman's explorations were a disappointment: he had neither found a promising area for trade nor a useful new shipping route. Although Tasman was received courteously on his return, the company was upset that Tasman had not fully explored the lands he found, and decided that a more "persistent explorer" should be chosen for any future expeditions. For over a century, until the era of James Cook, Tasmania and New Zealand were not visited by Europeans; mainland Australia was visited, but usually only by accident.

=== Later life ===
On 2 November 1644, Abel Tasman was appointed a member of the Council of Justice in Batavia. He retired in 1653 at age fifty; at that time he owned 288 acres of land in Batavia and captained a small cargo ship, of which he was a part-owner.

In April 1657, Tasman wrote his will and testament, describing himself as ill but not bedridden. Tasman died at Batavia on 10 October 1659 at about age 56 and was survived by his second wife and a daughter by his first wife. His property was divided between his wife and his daughter. In his will, he left 25 guilders to the poor of his village, Lutjegast.

Although Tasman's pilot, Frans Visscher, published Memoir concerning the discovery of the South land in 1642, Tasman's detailed journal was not published until 1898. Nevertheless, some of his charts and maps were in general circulation and used by subsequent explorers. The journal signed by Abel Tasman of the 1642 voyage is held in the Dutch National Archives at The Hague.

== Legacy ==
Tasman's ten-month voyage in 1642–43 had significant consequences. By circumnavigating Australia (albeit at a distance) Tasman proved that the small fifth continent was not joined to any larger sixth continent, such as the long-imagined Southern Continent. Further, Tasman's suggestion that New Zealand was the western side of that Southern Continent was seized upon by many European cartographers who, for the next century, depicted New Zealand as the west coast of a Terra Australis rising gradually from the waters around Tierra del Fuego. This theory was eventually disproved when Captain Cook circumnavigated New Zealand in 1769.

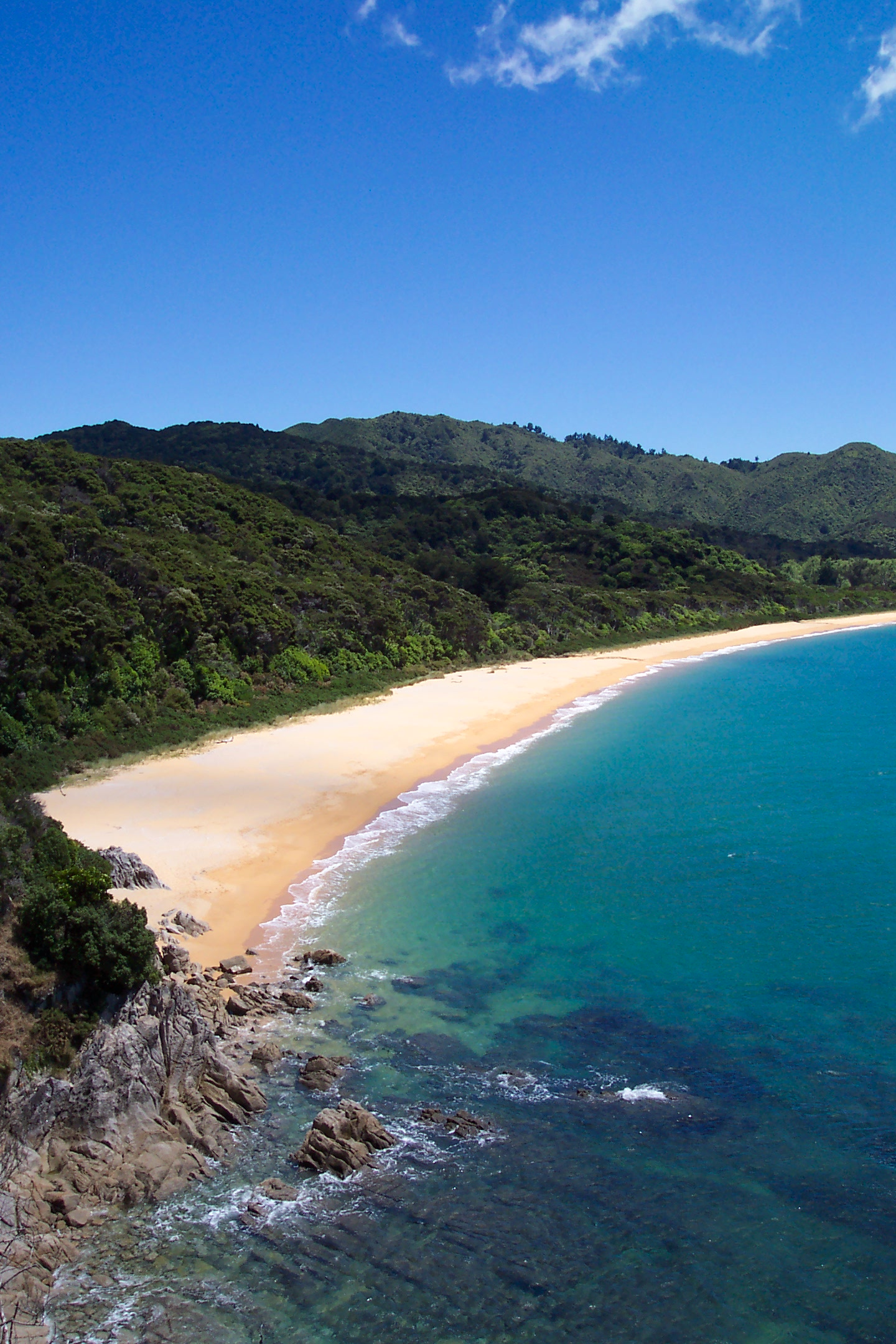
Abel Tasman National Park

Multiple places have been named after Tasman, including:

- The Australian island and state of Tasmania, renamed after him, formerly Van Diemen's land. It includes features such as:
  - The Tasman Peninsula
  - The Tasman Bridge
  - The Tasman Highway
- The Tasman Sea
- In New Zealand:
  - The Tasman Glacier
  - Tasman Lake
  - The Tasman River
  - Mount Tasman
  - The Abel Tasman National Park
  - Tasman Bay
  - The Tasman District
  - Abel Tasman Monument

Also named after Tasman are:

- Tasman Pulp and Paper company, a large pulp and paper producer in Kawerau, New Zealand
- Abel Tasman Drive, in Tākaka
- The former passenger/vehicle ferry Abel Tasman
- The Able Tasmans – an indie band from Auckland, New Zealand
- Tasman, a layout engine for Internet Explorer
- 6594 Tasman (1987 MM1), a main-belt asteroid
- Tasman Drive in San Jose, California, and its Tasman light rail station, named after the Tasman Sea
- Tasman Road in Claremont, Cape Town, South Africa
- HMNZS Tasman, shore-based training establishment of the Royal New Zealand Navy at Lyttleton in the South Island
- HMAS Tasman is a Hunter-class frigate that is expected to enter service with the Royal Australian Navy in the late 2020s

His portrait has been on four New Zealand postage stamp issues, on a 1992 5 NZD coin, and on 1963, 1966 and 1985 Australian postage stamps.

In the Netherlands, many streets are named after him. In Lutjegast, the village where he was born, there is a museum dedicated to his life and travels.

Tasman's life was dramatised for radio in Early in the Morning (1946) a play by Ruth Park.

=== Portraits and depictions ===
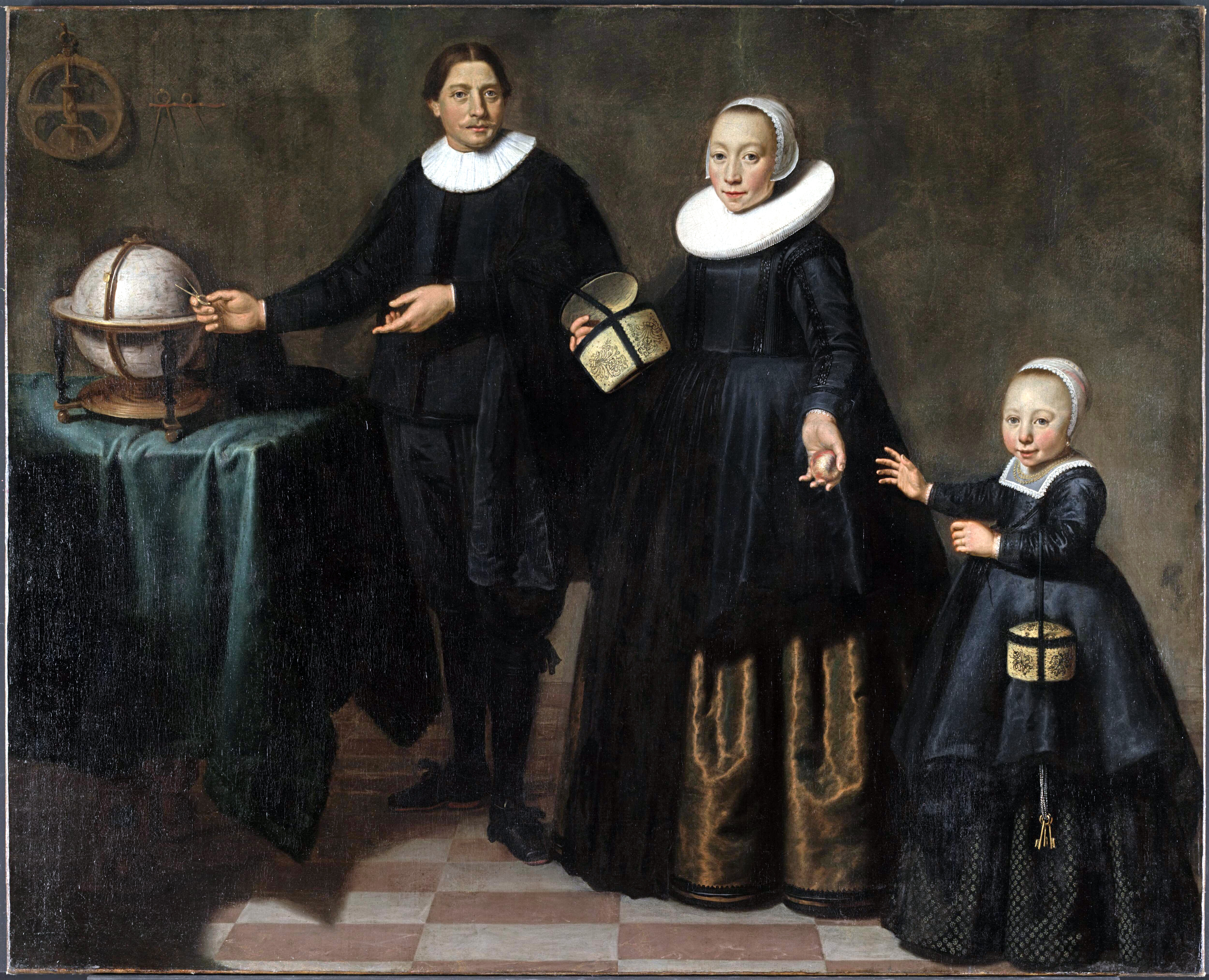
Portrait of disputed provenance held by the National Library of Australia, purported to depict Tasman and his family

A drawing titled Abel Janssen Tasman, Navigateur en Australie is held by the State Library of New South Wales as part of "a portfolio of 26 ink drawings of 16th and 17th century Dutch admirals, navigators and governor-generals of the VOC". The portfolio was acquired at an art auction in The Hague in 1862. However, it is unclear if the drawing is of Tasman and its original source is unknown, although it has been said to resemble the work of Dutch engraver Jacobus Houbraken. The drawing has been assessed as having the "most reliable provenance" of any depiction of Tasman with "no strong reason to doubt that the drawing is not genuine".

In 1948, the National Library of Australia acquired from Rex Nan Kivell a portrait purporting to depict Tasman with his wife and stepdaughter, which was attributed to Jacob Gerritsz. Cuyp and dated to 1637. In 2018 the painting was exhibited by the Groninger Museum in the Netherlands which identified it as "the only known portrait of the explorer". However, the Netherlands Institute for Art History has instead attributed the painting to Dirck van Santvoort and concluded that the painting does not depict Tasman and his family.

The provenance provided from Nan Kivell for the family portrait has been unable to be verified. Nan Kivell claimed that the portrait was passed down through the Springer family – relatives of Tasman's widow – and was sold at Christie's in 1877. However, Christie's records indicate that the portrait was not owned by the Springer family or associated with Tasman, and was instead sold as "Portrait of an astronomer" by "Anthonie Palamedes" [sic]. Nan Kivell additionally claimed that the portrait was sold at Christie's a second time in 1941, however no records exist to support this. A survey of portraits of Tasman published in 2019 concluded that the provenance was "either invented by Rex Nan Kivell or by the unnamed art dealer who sold it to Rex Nan Kivell", and that the painting "should therefore not be considered a portrait of Abel Tasman's family".

Outside of the Nan Kivell painting, another purported portrait of Tasman was "discovered" in 1893 and eventually acquired by the Tasmanian government in 1976 for the Tasmanian Museum and Art Gallery (TMAG). The painting is unsigned and was attributed to Bartholomeus van der Helst at the time of its discovery, but this attribution was disputed by Dutch art historian Cornelis Hofstede de Groot and Alec Martin of Christie's. In 1985, TMAG curator Dan Gregg stated that "the painter of the life-sized portrait is unknown [...] there is some uncertainty as to whether the portrait is really of Tasman".

== Tasman map ==
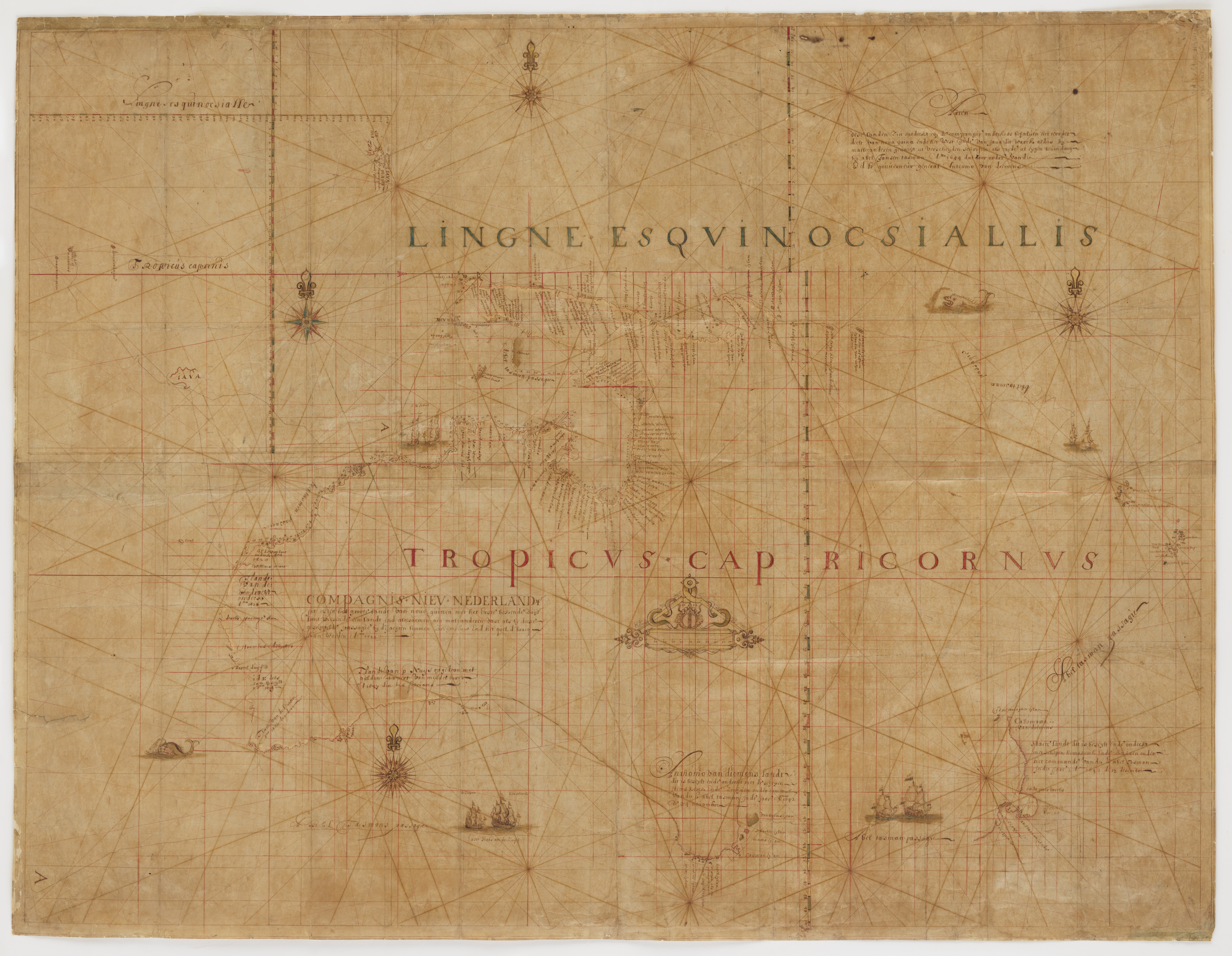
'Bonaparte Tasman map', includes inset with Mauritius, Indonesia and Sumatra, c. 1644

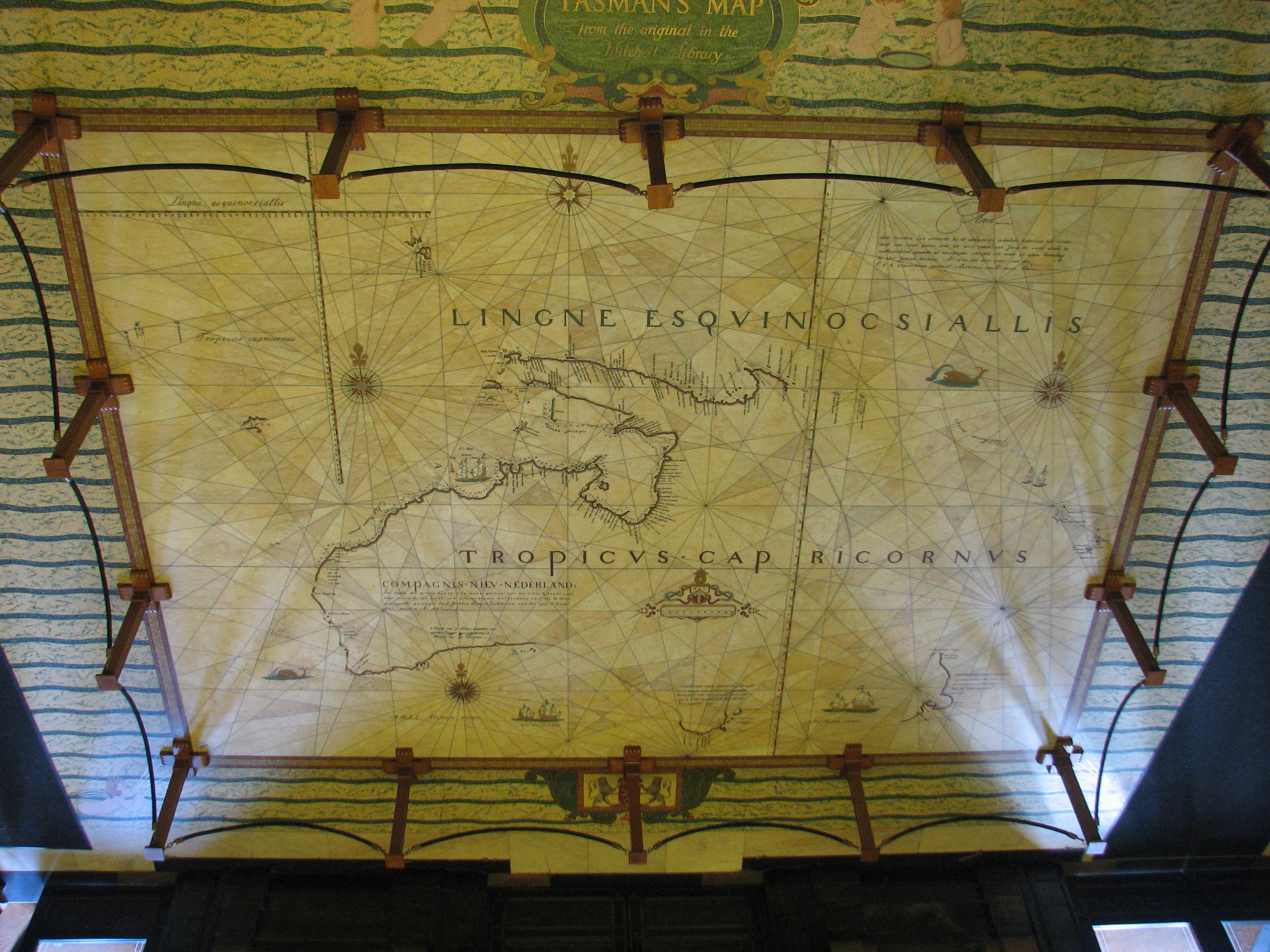
State Library of New South Wales vestibule, showing a mosaic of the Tasman map inlaid in the floor

The Tasman map is in the collection of the State Library of New South Wales. It is thought to have been drawn by Isaac Gilsemans, or completed under the supervision of Franz Jacobszoon Visscher. The map is also known as the Bonaparte map, as it was once owned by Prince Roland Bonaparte, the great-nephew of Napoleon Bonaparte. The map was completed sometime after 1644 and is based on the original charts drawn during Tasman's first and second voyages. As none of the journals or logs composed during Tasman's second voyage have survived, the Bonaparte map remains an important contemporary artefact of Tasman's voyage to the northern coast of the Australian continent.

The Tasman map reveals the extent of understanding the Dutch had of the Australian continent at the time. The map includes the western and southern coasts of Australia, accidentally encountered by Dutch voyagers as they journeyed by way of the Cape of Good Hope to the VOC headquarters in Batavia. In addition, the map shows the tracks of Tasman's two voyages. Of his second voyage, the map shows the Banda Islands, the southern coast of New Guinea and much of the northern coast of Australia. However, the land areas adjacent to the Torres Strait are shown unexamined; this is despite Tasman having been given orders by VOC Council at Batavia to explore the possibility of a channel between New Guinea and the Australian continent.

There is debate as to the origin of the map. It is widely believed that the map was produced in Batavia; however, it has also been argued that the map was produced in Amsterdam. The authorship of the map has also been debated: while the map is commonly attributed to Tasman, it is now thought to have been the result of a collaboration, probably involving Franchoijs Visscher and Isaack Gilsemans, who took part in both of Tasman's voyages. Whether the map was produced in 1644 is also subject to debate, as a VOC company report in December 1644 suggested that at that time no maps showing Tasman's voyages were yet complete.

In 1943, a mosaic version of the map, composed of coloured brass and marble, was inlaid into the vestibule floor of the Mitchell Library in Sydney. The work was commissioned by the Principal Librarian William Ifould, and completed by the Melocco Brothers of Annandale, who also worked on the ANZAC War Memorial in Hyde Park and the crypt at St Mary's Cathedral, Sydney.

== See also ==
- Dieppe maps
- Willem Janszoon
- Janszoon voyage of 1605–06
- Theory of Portuguese discovery of Australia

== Sources ==
- Serle, Percival (1949). "Tasman, Abel". Dictionary of Australian Biography. Sydney: Angus & Robertson.
- Edward Duyker (ed.) The Discovery of Tasmania: Journal Extracts from the Expeditions of Abel Janszoon Tasman and Marc-Joseph Marion Dufresne 1642 & 1772, St David's Park Publishing/Tasmanian Government Printing Office, Hobart, 1992, pp. 106, ISBN 0-7246-2241-1.
- William Eaton (1905), Tasman: a forgotten navigator , Brisbane: Royal Geographical Society of Australasia, Wikidata Q108780897 – via Wikisource
- Mack, Rüdiger (2019). "New light on the portraits of Abel Tasman". The Great Circle. 41 (2). Australian Association for Maritime History: 46–64. JSTOR 26910735.
- Quanchi, Max (2005). Historical Dictionary of the Discovery and Exploration of the Pacific Islands. The Scarecrow Press. ISBN 0810853957.
- Beazley, Charles Raymond (1911), "Tasman, Abel Janszoon" , in Chisholm, Hugh (ed.), Encyclopædia Britannica, vol. 26 (11th ed.), Cambridge University Press, pp. 437–438
- Mack, Rudiger (2024), First Encounters: The Early Pacific and European Narratives of Abel Tasman's 1642 Voyage. Feilding, New Zealand: Heritage Press. ISBN 978-1-991097-00-2
