= Lutjegast =

Village in Groningen, Netherlands

- Village
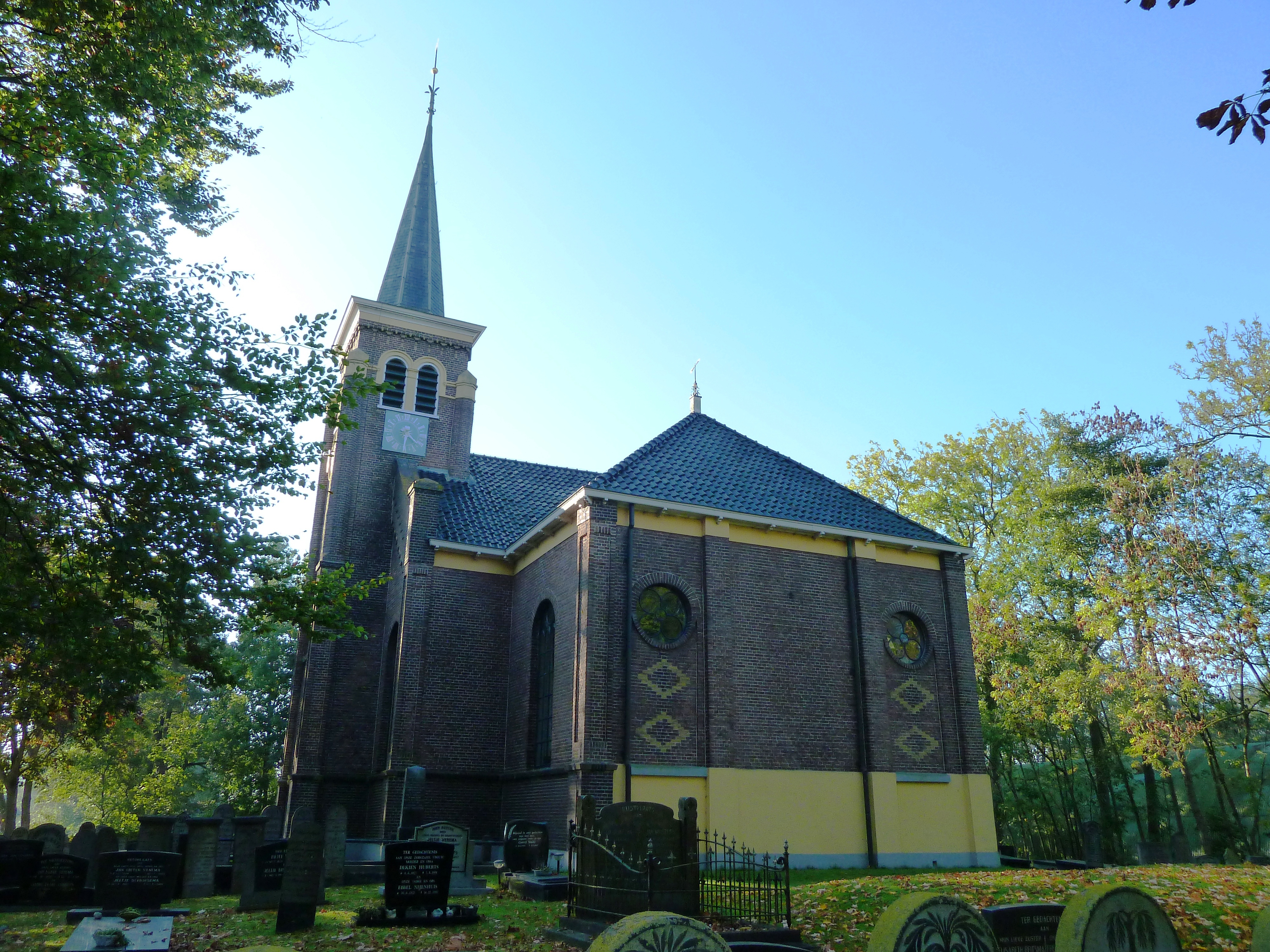
- The Reformed Church in Lutjegast

- Location in the province of Groningen in the Netherlands Lutjegast (Netherlands)
- Coordinates: 53°14′0″N 6°15′28″E
- Country: Netherlands
- Province: Groningen
- Municipality: Westerkwartier

Area
  - Total: 19.89 km^{2} (7.68 sq mi)
- Elevation: 2.3 m (7.5 ft)

Population (2021)
  - Total: 1,120
  - Density: 56.3/km^{2} (146/sq mi)
- Time zone: UTC+1 (CET)
  - Summer (DST): UTC+2 (CEST)
- Postal code: 9866
- Dialing code: 0594

Lutjegast (Dutch pronunciation: [ˈlʏtɕəɣɑst]) is a village in the municipality of Westerkwartier in Groningen, Netherlands. It had a population of around 1,125 in January 2017.

== History ==
The name Lutjegast originates from Gronings in which lutje means small or little and a ga(a)st is a higher, sandy ridge in an otherwise swampy area. The village was first mentioned in 1459 as "op de Lutkegast". Lutjegast is a road village which developed on a sandy ridge.

The Dutch Reformed church was built in 1877 and was restored in 1922. The Reformed Church is a cruciform church built in 1922 without a tower in expressionist style.

Lutjegast was the birthplace of the explorer Abel Tasman. He is memorialised in town by a monument, plaque and street name. In 2014, a museum dedicated to Abel Tasman opened in the village house.

Until 1828, a manor house named "Rikkerdaborg" stood in Lutjegast. Its most famous occupant was Bernard Johan Prott who was the commander of Bourtange in 1672. Christoph Bernhard von Galen, the Prince-bishop of Münster had allegedly offered Prott ƒ200,000.- to take Bourtange, however Prott refused the offer and von Galen was unable to take the fortress by force.

Lutjegast was home to 294 people in 1840. The village used to be part of the municipality of Grootegast. In 2019, it was merged into Westerkwartier.

== Notable people ==
- Abel Tasman (ca.1603–1659), explorer, first European to discover Tasmania and New Zealand.
- Arjen Lubach (born 1979), comedian, author, music producer and TV presenter.
- Klaasje Meijer (born 1995), singer, actress and flautist

== Gallery ==
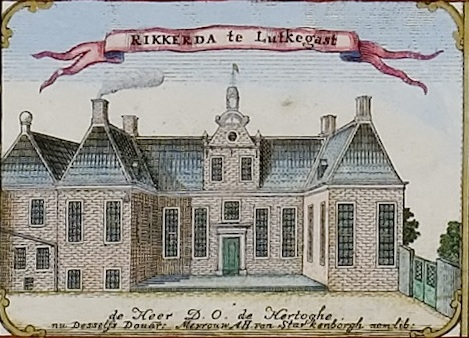
Rikkerdaborg

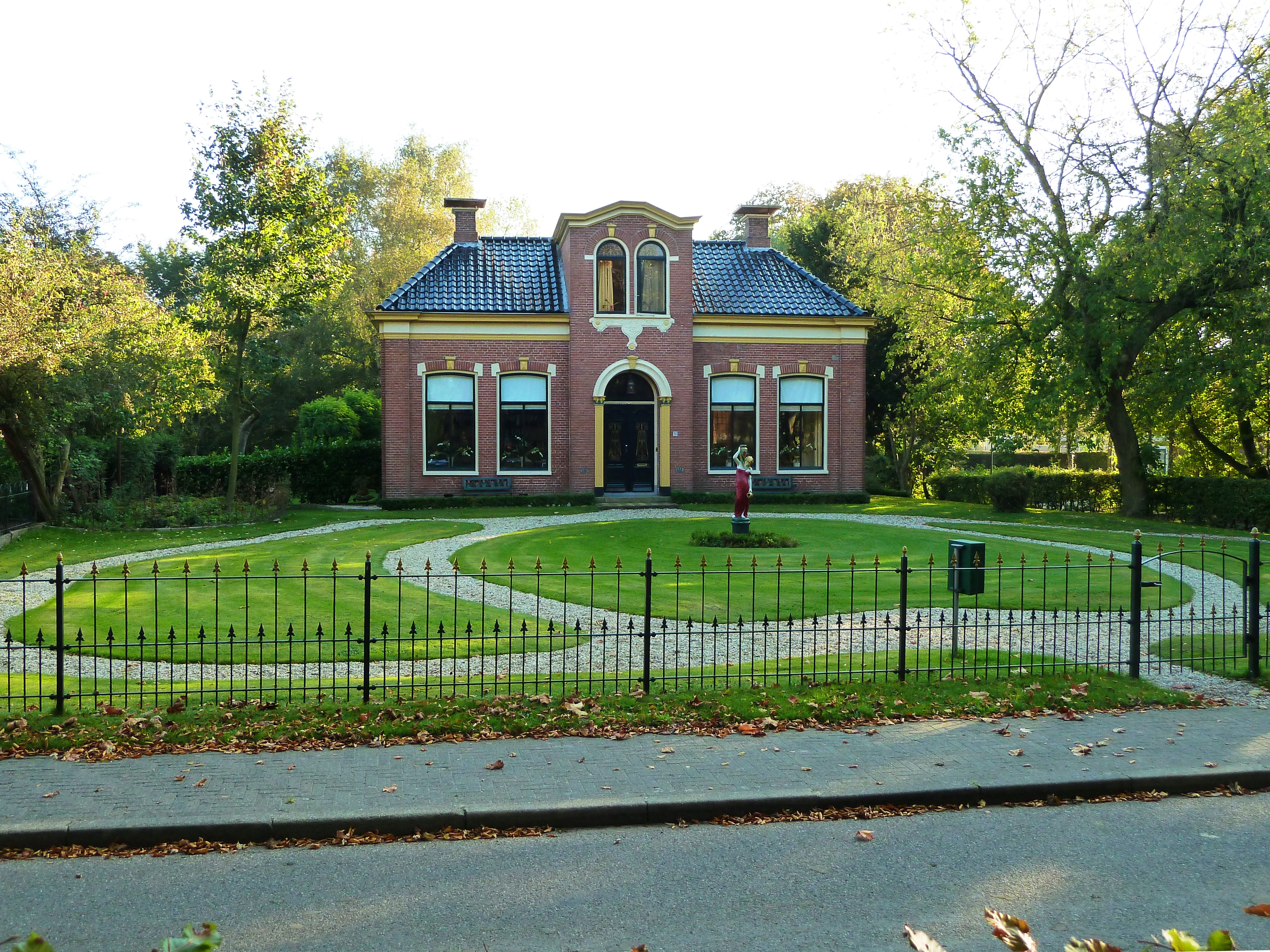
Former clergy house

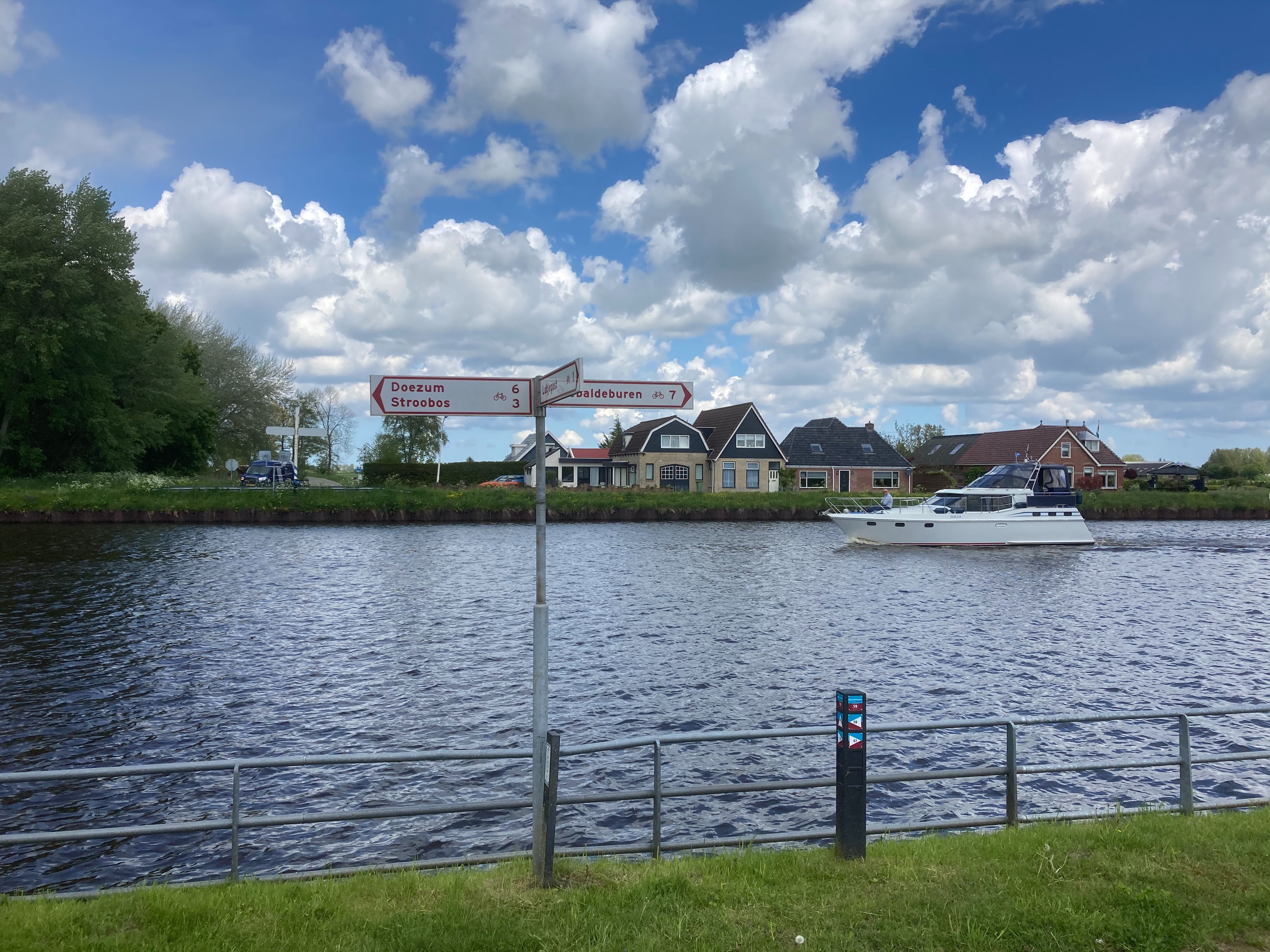
View on Lutjegast

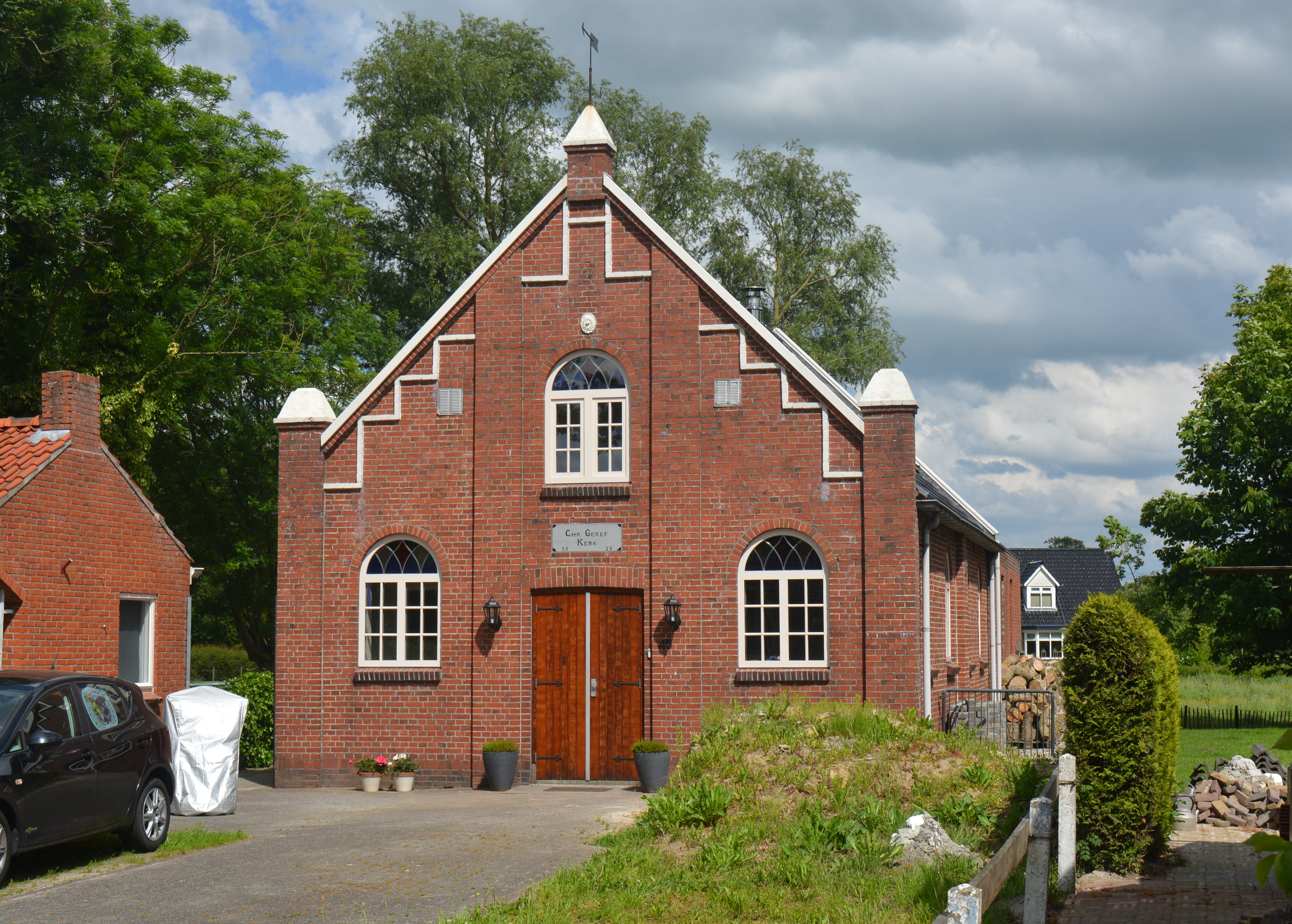
Reformed church in Lutjegast
