= Frans Jacobszoon Visscher =

Dutch mariner and explorer

Frans Jacobszoon Visscher was a Dutch mariner and explorer, who voyaged as pilot-major on the first voyage of Abel Tasman to the Southern Hemisphere, between August 1642 and 15 June 1643 and was a native of Flushing, Netherlands. He is known to have lived in the period 1623–1645. His first name may be written Franchoijs or Franchoys etc.; his middle name may be found sometimes abbreviated "Jacobsz."

According to the specialist on Visscher and Abel Tasman, Michael Ross, Visscher had been in Asia about ten years before Tasman's great voyage. He was a mate and steersman on the Nassau fleet (1623-6) of Jacob L’Hermite and Hugo Schapeham. Visscher was therefore able to develop the proposal that would lead to Tasman's 1642 expedition, and he was an ideal person to choose as navigator.

In 1642, Visscher published Memoir concerning the discovery of the South land.
