= Isaack Gilsemans =

Dutch merchant and artist (c.1606–1646)

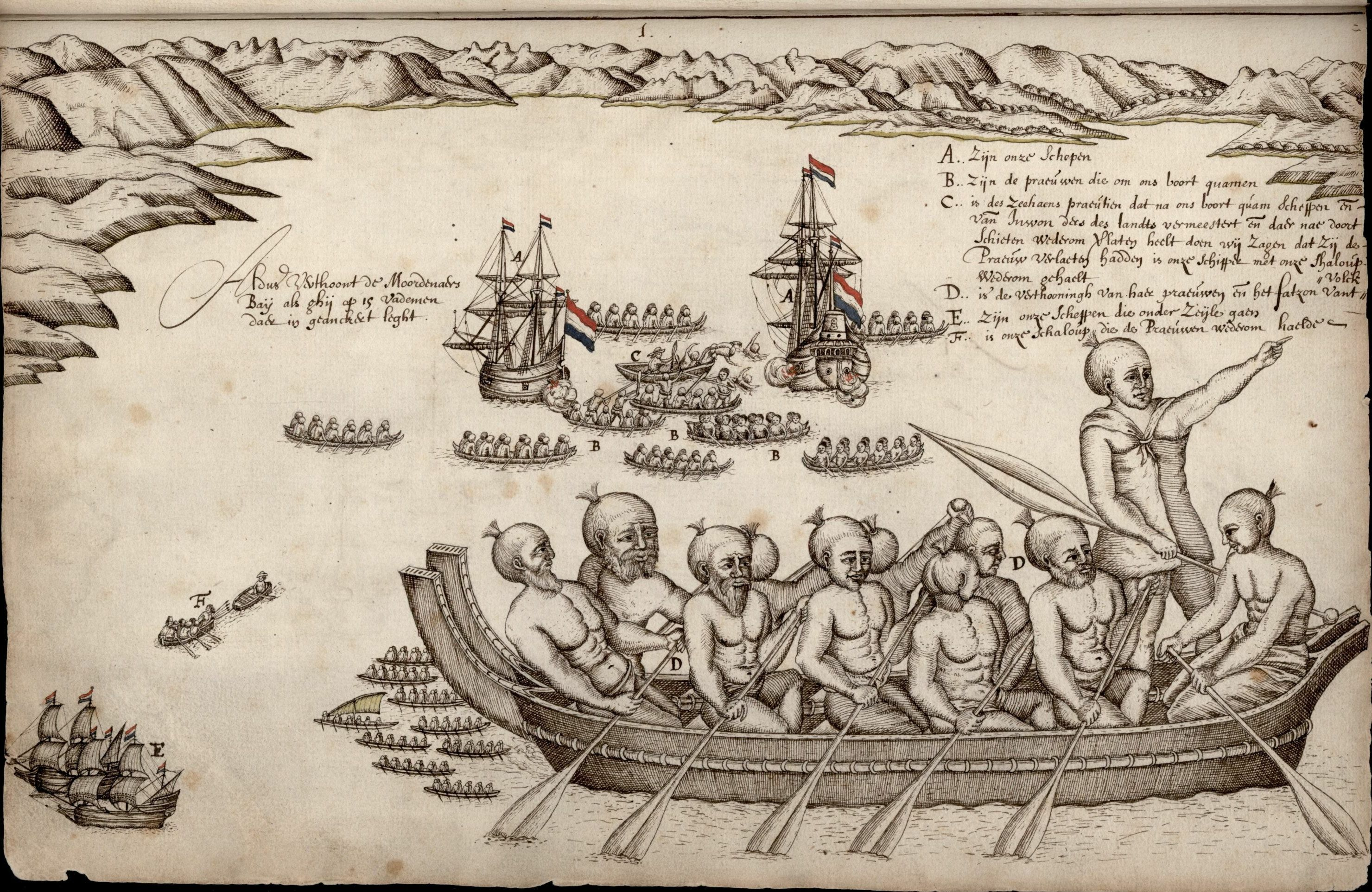
A view of the Murderers' Bay, as you are at anchor here in 15 fathom by Isaack Gilsemans, Alexander Turnbull Library, 1642

Isaack Gilsemans (ca. 1606, in Rotterdam – 1646, in Batavia, Dutch East Indies), was a Dutch merchant, officer of the Dutch East India Company and artist.

== Biography ==
Gilsemans is most noted for joining the explorer Abel Tasman on his expedition in 1642-43 during which Tasmania, New Zealand and several Pacific Islands became known to Europeans. Gilsemans produced a number of drawings that documented island and native life. His depictions of the Māori people were the first for Europeans.

A sketcher and cartographer, he is thought to have been responsible for the coastal profiles in Tasman's journal and therefore the first European to make an image of Van Diemen's Land. Gilsemans' chart is responsible for documenting the first European landing in Tasmania in 1642, as a result of which Gilsemans Bay near Dunalley is named after him.
