= Benoît Farjat =

French engraver

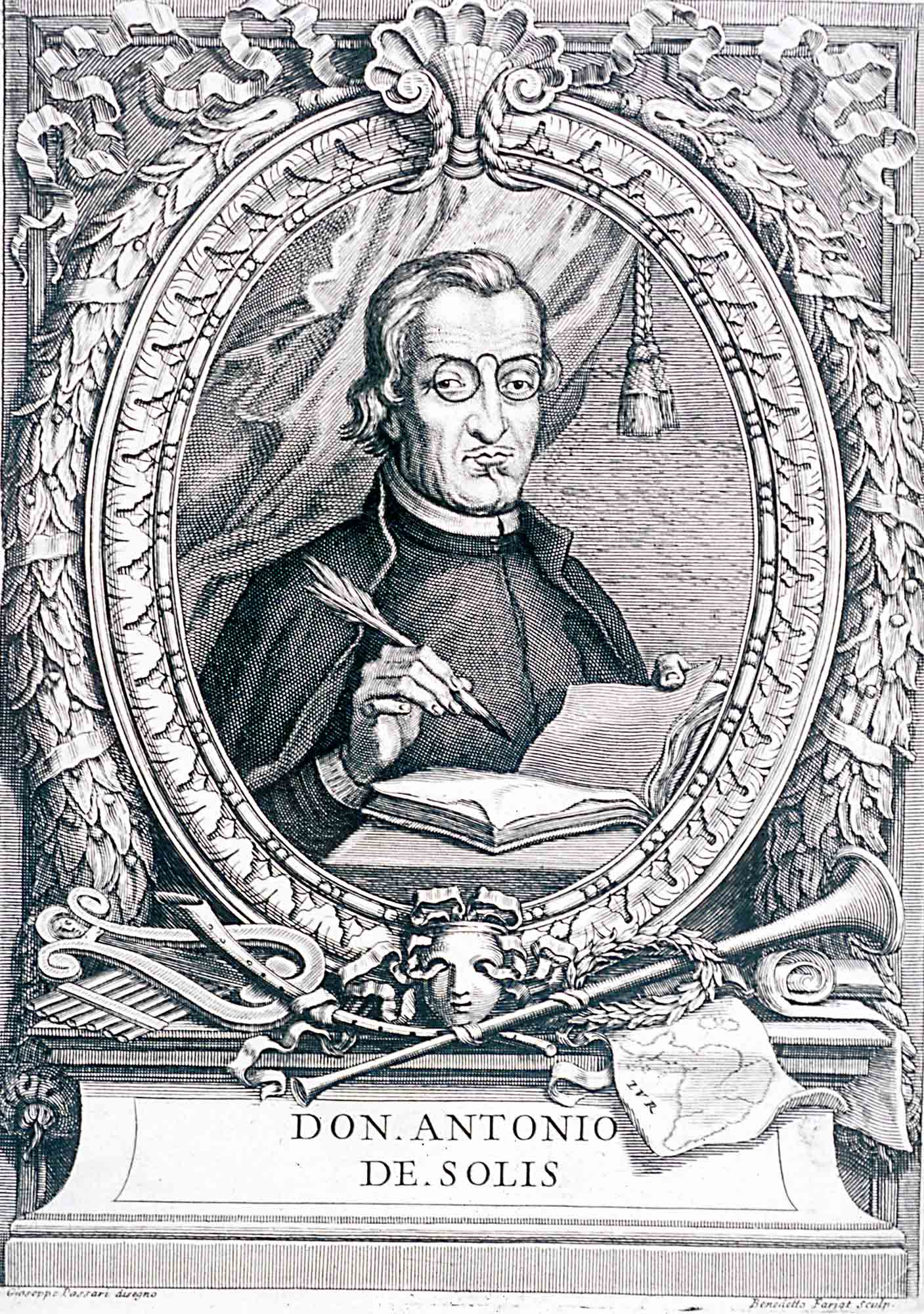
Antonio de Solís y Ribadeneyra, 1699

Benoît Farjat (1646–1724) was a French engraver born at Lyons. He was taught the elements of the art by Guillaume Chasteau, whose manner he at first adopted; but he afterwards went to Rome, and acquired a greater command of the graver, and a better style of design, though he is not always correct. He died in Rome in 1724. There are by him some portraits, and various subjects from the Italian masters; the following are the most esteemed:

== Portraits ==
- Cardinal Federigo Coccia; after L. David.
- Cardinal Cornaro; (Note: There have been two cardinals called Francesco Cornaro. Both died well before L. David was born, and it is unclear which one this was.) after the same. 1697.
- Cardinal Tommaso Ferrari; after the same. 1695.

== Subjects after various masters ==
- The Holy Family, with St. John; after Albani.
- The Holy Family, with St. John presenting a Cross; after Pietro da Cortona.
- The Marriage, or, according to others, the Coronation, of St. Catharine; after Agostino Carracci.
- The Virgin and Infant Jesns, with St. John presenting some fruit; after Annibale Carracci.
- The Temptation of St. Anthony; after the same.
- The Communion of St. Jerome; after Domenichino.
- The Death of St. Francis Xavier; after G. B. Gaulli.
- The Marriage of the Virgin; after C. Maratti.
- The Nativity of Christ; after the same.
- The Race of Atalanta; after P. Locatelli.
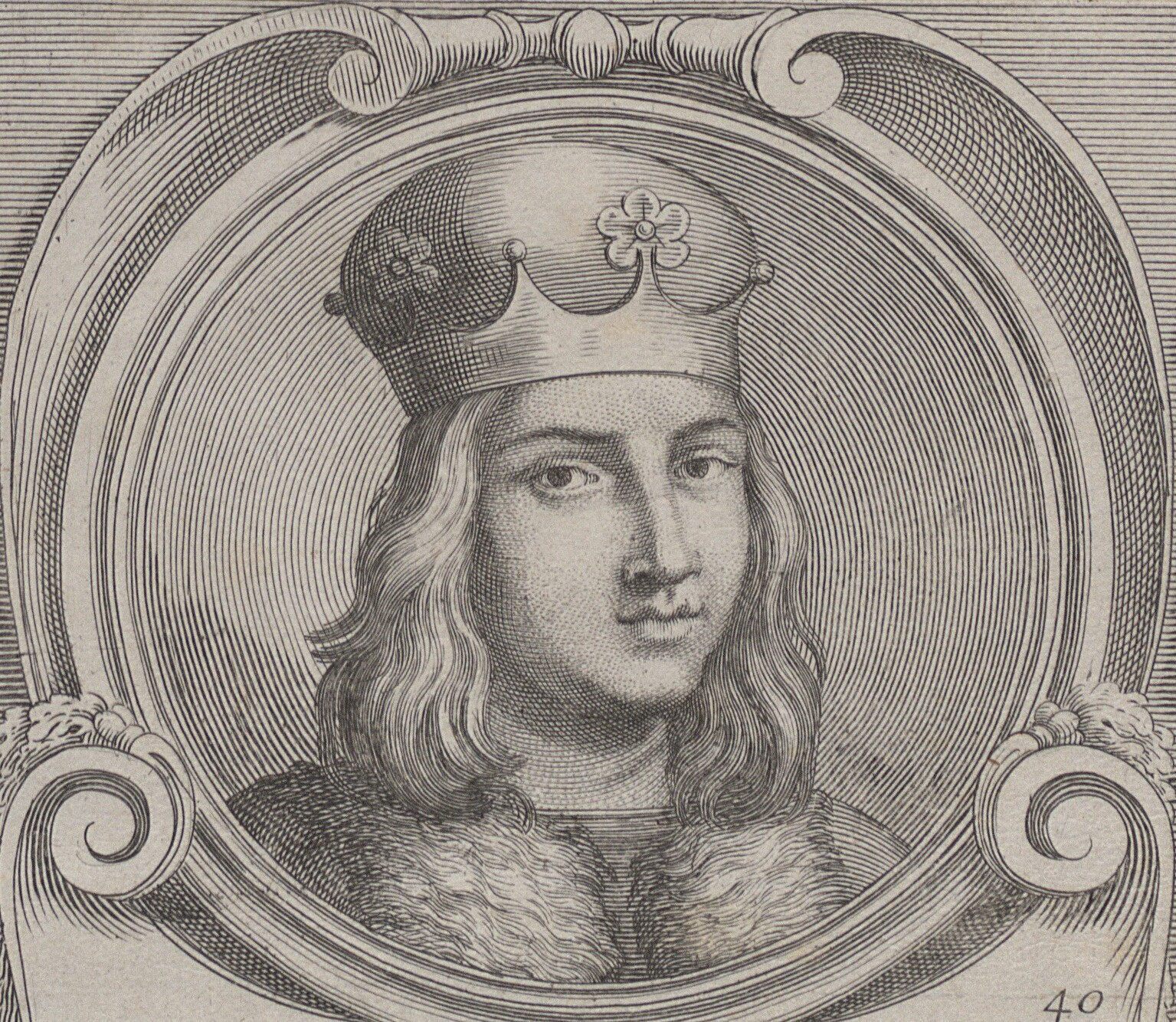
Alexander Jagiellon, published in 1763

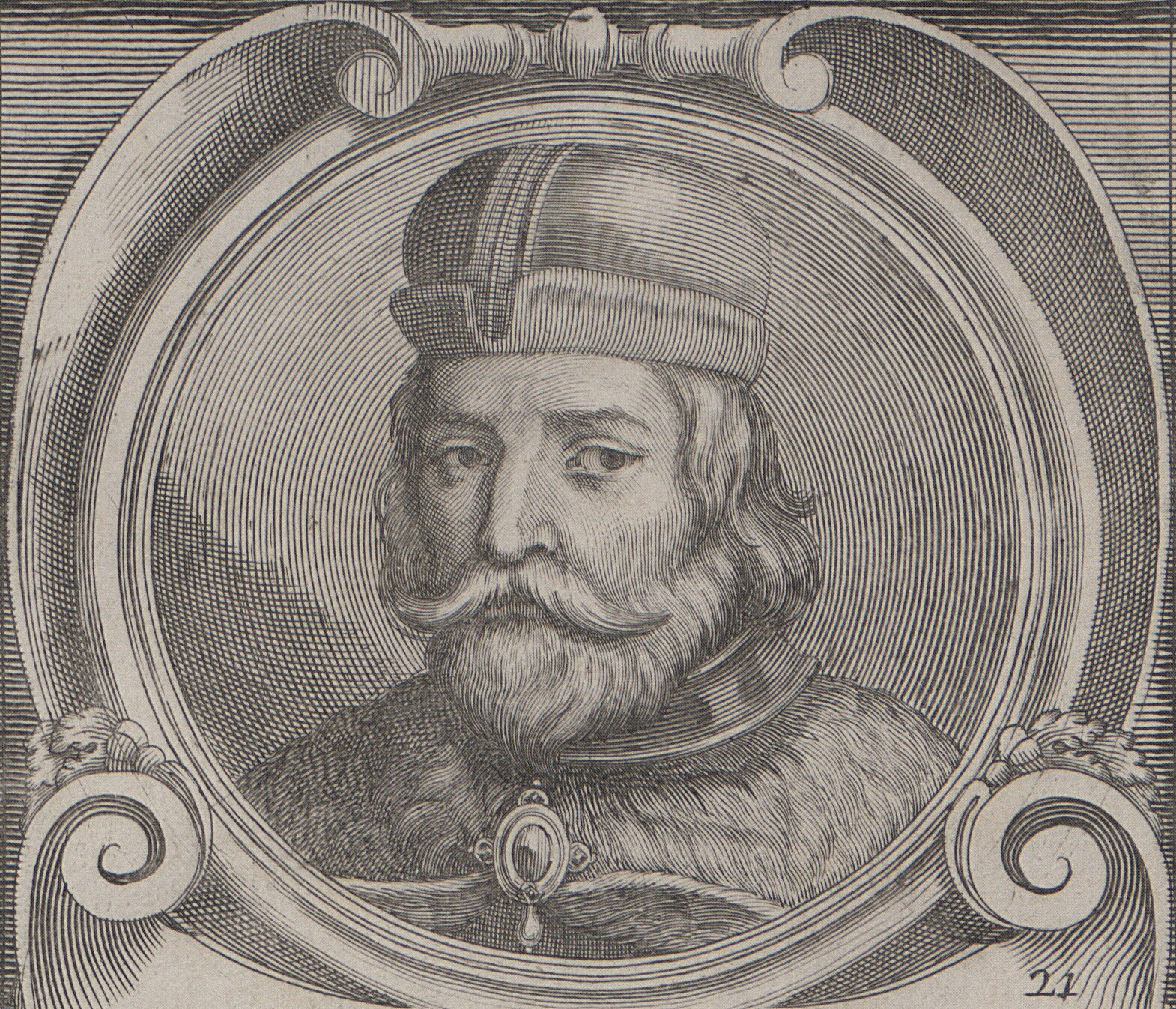
Bolesław III Wrymouth, published in 1763
