= Jonas Bergman =

Finnish painter

Jonas Bergman (1724–1810) was a Finnish painter living and working in what was then Sweden for most of his life.

Bergman was born in Turku. He married Ulrika Lang on 19 October 1749. She was the daughter of the church painter Claes Lang. Bergman primarily painted pulpit and altarpieces, including works in the following churches: Sottunga (1753), Paimio (1755), Nummi (1759), Föglö (1759), Alastaro and Rymättylä (1766).
