= Francesco Cornaro =

Francesco Cornaro may refer to:

- Francesco Cornaro (1478–1543), Italian cardinal
- Francesco Cornaro (1547–1598), Italian cardinal
- Francesco Cornaro (Doge) (1585–1656), Doge of Venice

== See also ==
- House of Cornaro
