= Annunciation (Guercino) =

Painting by Guercino

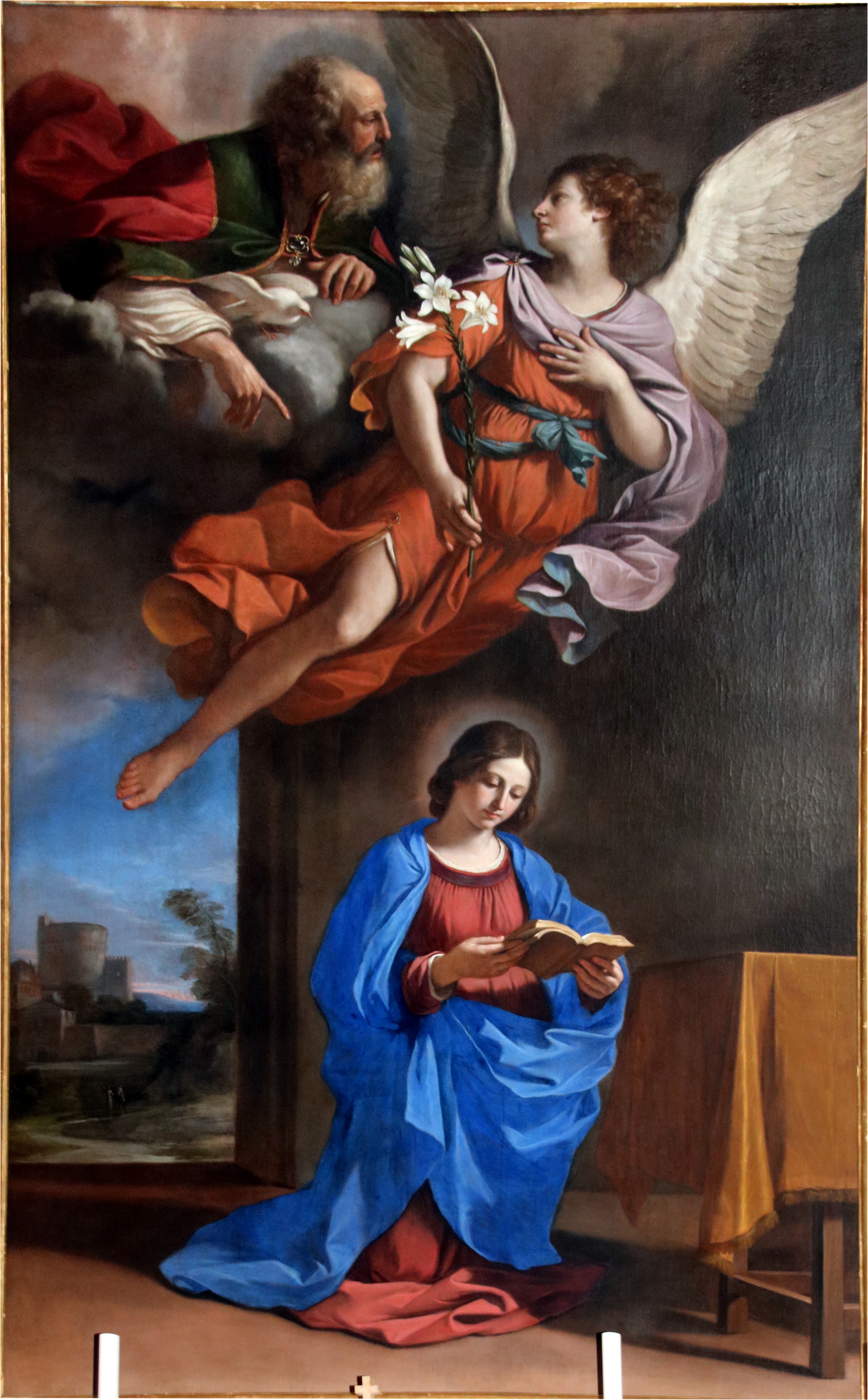
Annunciation (1646) by Guercino

Annunciation is a 1646 oil on canvas painting by Guercino, now in the collegiate church of Santa Maria Maggiore in Pieve di Cento, a few kilometres from the painter's birthplace of Cento. The artist used the same colours for Mary's clothes in his 1656 Immaculate Conception (Pinacoteca Civica F. Podesti, Ancona), along with the face of God.

== History ==
The work was commissioned by Francesco Maria Mastellari for the high altarpiece of "the church of Santissima Annunciata degli Scolopi" for 183 scudi, a price far below the artist's worth, probably indicating a strong link between him and Mastellari's family. In 1678 Carlo Cesare Malvasia called it "An altarpiece of the Annunciation for the Lords Mastellari of Pieve, placed in that church", referred to the payment for it and stated that the family held the patronage rights for the Scolopi monastery.

In 1924 the work's original church was deconsecrated and the painting passed to the town council, which placed it in its council hall until 1940, when it was moved to the first altar on the north side of the nave of the collegiate church of Santa Maria Maggiore, an altar dedicated to the Annunciation. That church was badly damaged in the 2012 Northern Italy earthquakes and the painting moved to the Museo MAGI 900, where it was restored with financial support from Genus Bononiae - Musei nella città, Sandra and Alberto Alberghini and the Lions Club of Pieve di Cento. The painting then appeared in the Guercino ritrovato (Guercino Rediscovered) curated in the palazzo Fava in Bologna by Vittorio Sgarbi.

== Bibliography ==
- (in Italian) Denis Mahon, Il Guercino (Giovanni Francesco Barbieri, 1591-1666): catalogo critico dei dipinti, Bologna, 1968.
