= The Angels' Kitchen =

Painting by Bartolomé Esteban Murillo

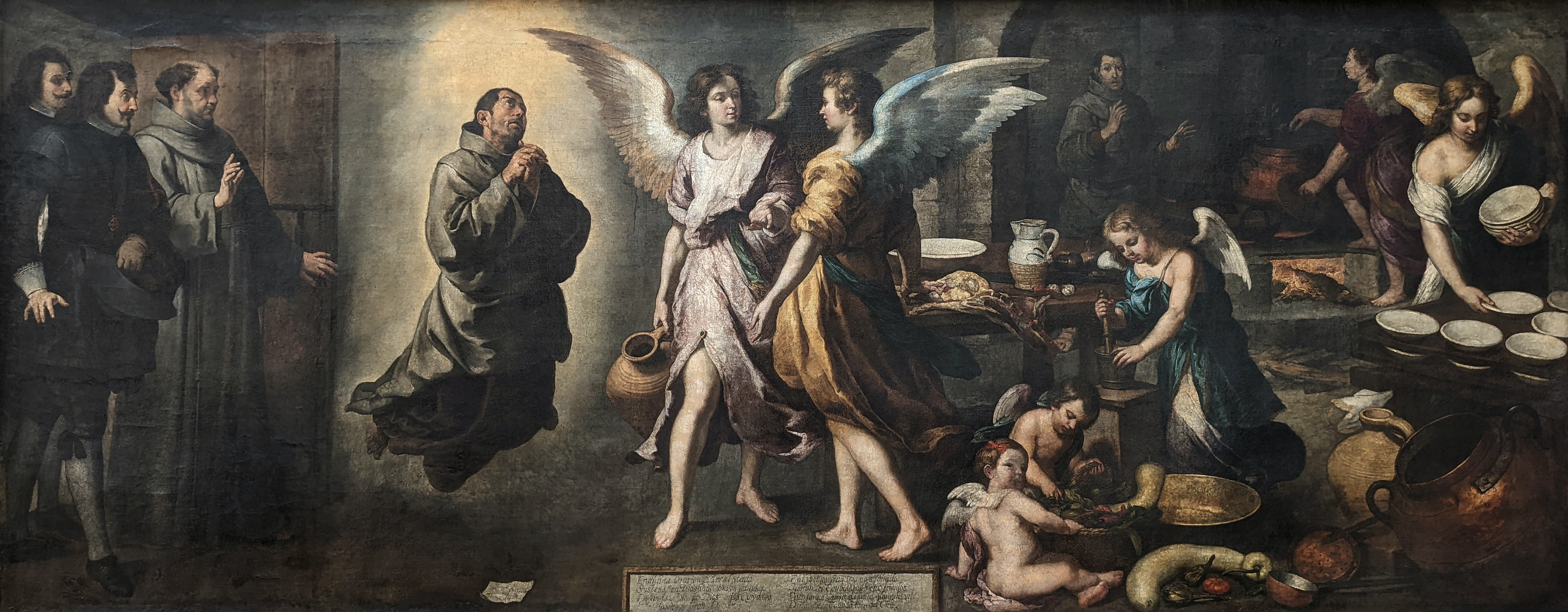
The Angels' Kitchen (1646) by Bartolomé Esteban Murillo

The Angels' Kitchen is a 1646 oil on canvas painting by Bartolomé Esteban Murillo, originally produced for a small Franciscan monastery in the artist's native Seville. From at least 1810 it was in the Alcázar of Seville, before being looted by Marshal Soult, arriving in his collection in Paris in 1813. The French state bought it in the sale of Soult's collection in 1858 and it has hung in the Louvre, in Paris, ever since.

Michel Butor included it in his list of 105 decisive masterpieces of Western art.

== History ==
It originally formed part of a set of twelve works, the others being:

- The Ecstasy of Saint Francis and Saint Diego Feeding Beggars (both Real Academia de Bellas Artes de San Fernando, Madrid)
- Brother Julian of Alcala and The Soul of Philip II (Clark Art Institute, Williamstown, USA)
- The Death of Saint Clare (Dresden Gemäldegalerie)
- Immaculate Conception and Saint Diego (lost)
- Saint Didacus of Alcalá and the Bishop of Pamplona (Musée des Augustins, Toulouse, France)
- Saint Salvador of Horta or Plague (Hertz. Pozzo di Borgo, Paris)
- The Blessed Giles Before Pope Gregory IX (North Carolina Museum of Art, Raleigh, USA)
- Two Franciscan Monks (National Gallery of Canada, Ottawa, Canada)
- Brother Juniper and the Poor Man (Museum of Fine Arts, Dole, France)

It shows an otherwise unknown scene from the history of the Franciscan order, possibly Brother Francisco Perez from Alcalá de Guadaíra, who was an assistant in the kitchen of the monastery of San Francisco el Grande. According to legend, he was such an ardent devotee that he once forgot his duties and fell asleep. When he woke up he found his duties miraculously fulfilled.
