= Pietro Paolo Raggi =

Italian painter (1646–1724)

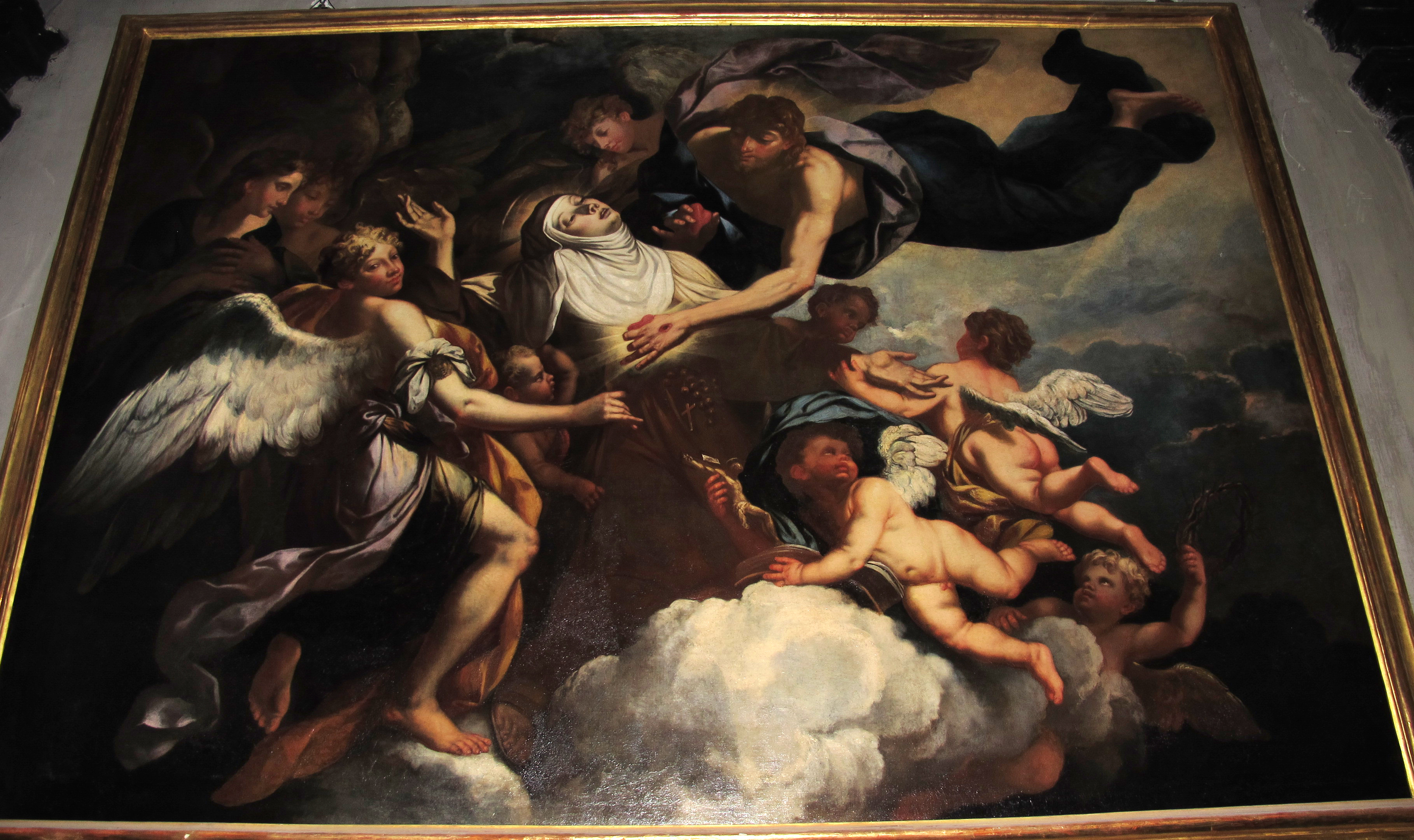

Pietro Paolo Raggi (1646–1724) was an Italian painter of the Baroque period, active mainly in Northern Italy.

Born in Genova, he received his first training in Venice, then came back to Genoa.

He is considered a follower of the Caracci in his St. Bonaventure contemplating a Crucifix a large picture in the church of S.S. Annunziata del Vastato in Genoa.

After visiting Turin, Savona and Lavagna, he established himself at Bergamo, where he painted a Magdalen borne to Heaven by Angels for the church of St. Martha.

There are Bacchanal and landscape subjects painted by him.

He is described by Luigi Lanzi as a "man of a restless disposition, irascible, and dissatisfied with every place he inhabited. This truant disposition carried him to Turin, then to Savona, then afresh to Genoa, now to Lavagna, now to Lombardy, and last to Bergamo", where he died in 1724.
