= Nötö =

Finnish island

- Village & Island
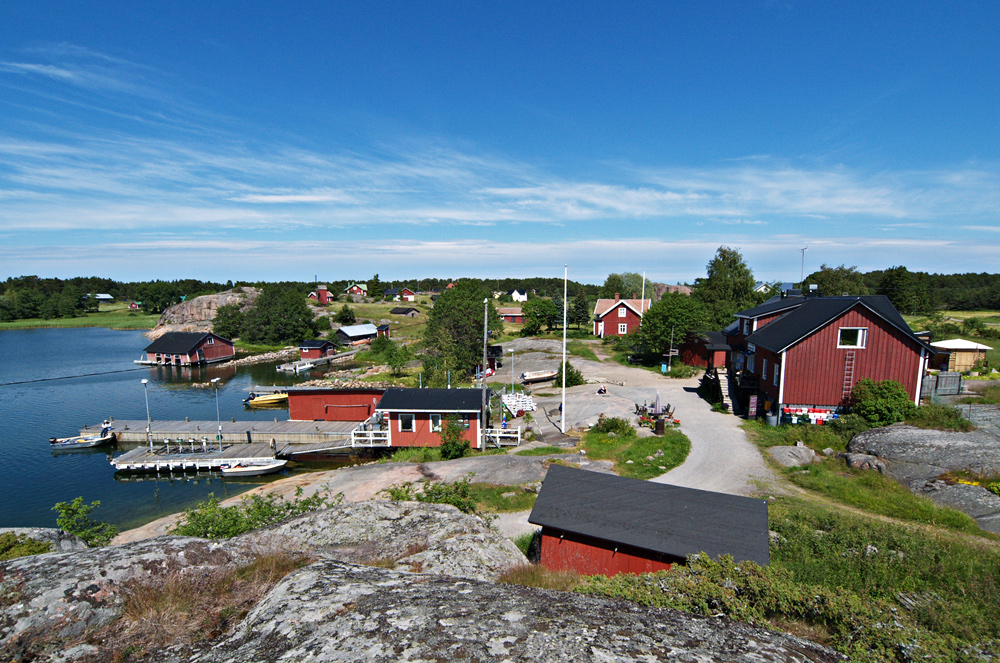
- Nötö
- Interactive map of Nötö
- Location in Finland
- Coordinates: 59°57′18″N 21°45′36″E
- Country: Finland
- Region: Southwest Finland
- Municipality: Pargas
- Sea: Archipelago Sea

Area
  - Total: 4 km^{2} (1.5 sq mi)

Nötö is an island in Pargas, Finland. It is one of the largest islands in the Archipelago Sea National Park.

== History ==
The settlement of Nötö began during the 11th century. It had 35 households and about 200 inhabitants.
