= Renier van Tzum =

Dutch merchant (c. 1600/1606 – 1670)

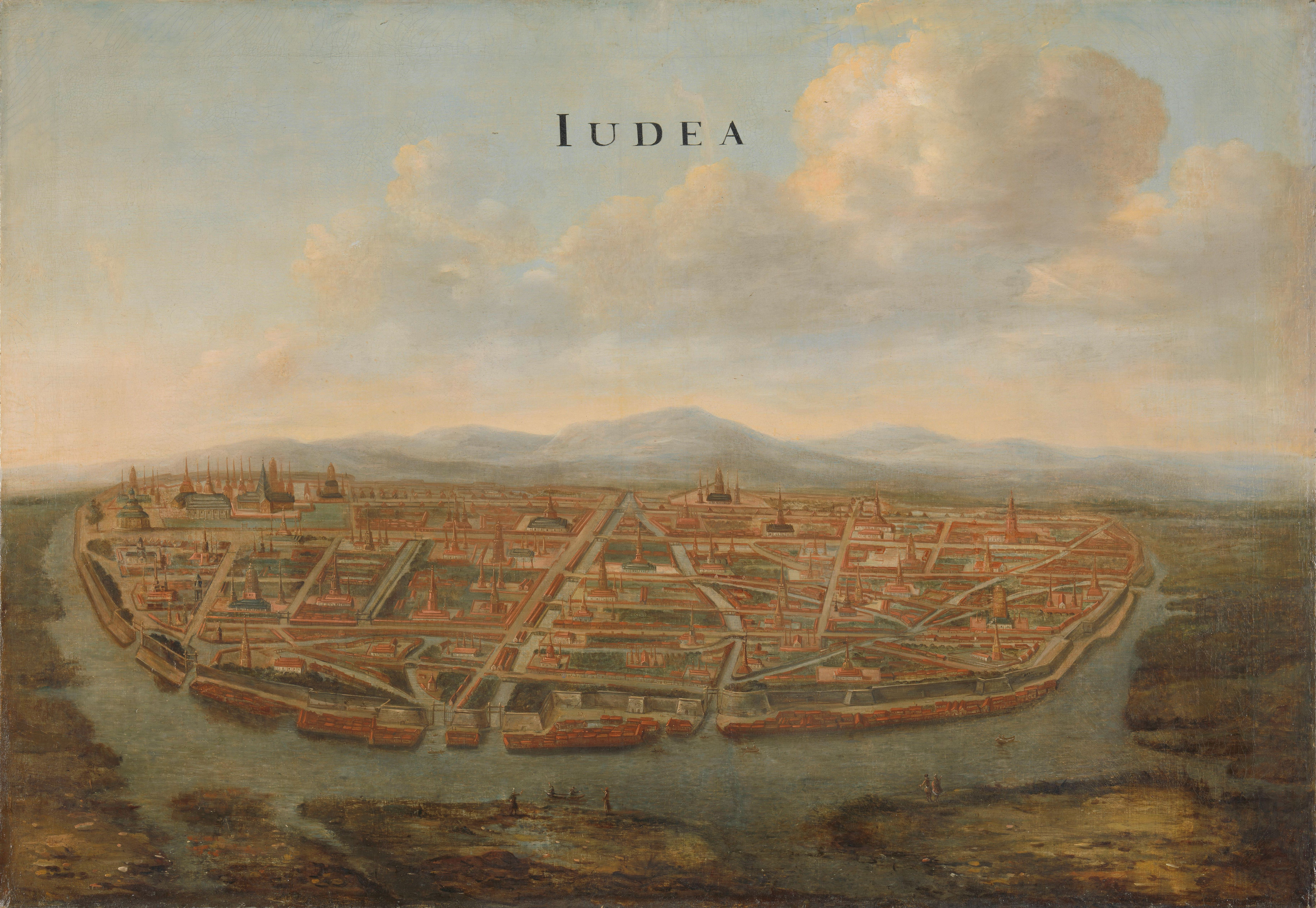
Ayutthaya (city) around 1665, with Dutch settlement on the square island south of the middle.

Renier van Tzum also known as Tzom or Reijnjer van't Zum, (c. 1600/1606 in Tzum – 21 September 1670 in IJlst), was a merchant/trader and official of the Dutch East India Company (Vereenigde Oost-Indische Compagnie or VOC).

== Biography ==
Van Tzum was born in the Frisian village Tzum or Tzom. He was the son of Marten Jansz (1575?-1624), a captain in the Admiralty of Friesland. His mother died in 1622; two brothers in 1628. It is not known when Van Tzum began working for the VOC. Van Tzum was sent to Siam in 1629. In 1636 he went on a boat ride on the Chao Phraya River with his colleagues. When Jeremias van Vliet left the factory in 1641, Van Tzum was nominated to succeed him, but first in 1643 he was appointed chief factor. He collaborated with Anthonie van Diemen in Batavia, Johan van Twist in Dutch Malacca, Maximiliaan le Maire and François Caron in Formosa, Jan van Elseracq on Deshima and the factors in Persia and at the Coromandel Coast. Van Tzum pretended to be sick when invited by the king.

=== Japan ===
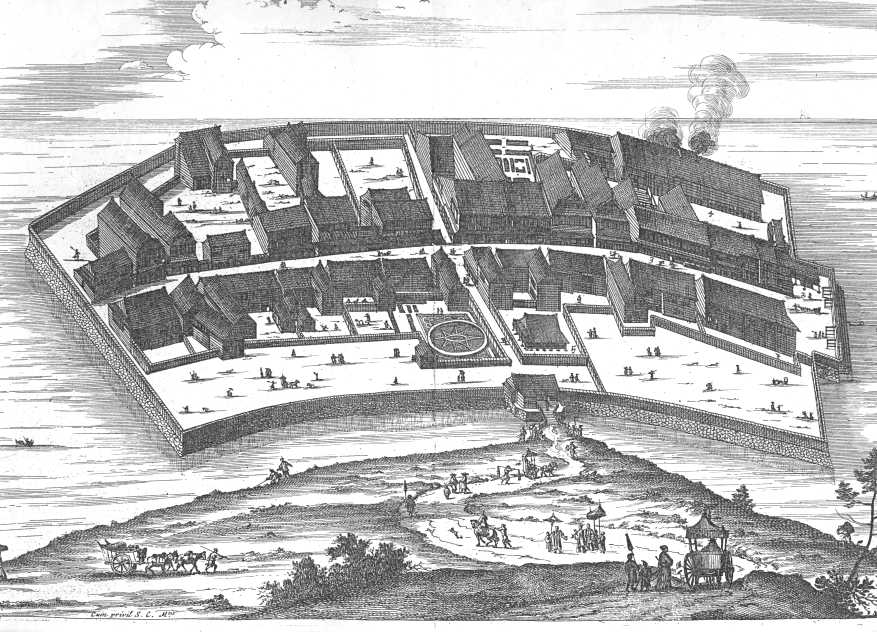
Dejima ca 1650. From: Arnoldus Montanus: Gedenkwaerdige Gesantschappen der Oost-Indische Maetschappy in't Vereenigde Nederland, aen de Kaisaren van Japan. 1669

On 29 September 1645 Van Tzum arrived on Deshima, starting as the VOC opperhoofd or chief factor on 24 November 1645. As head of the Dutch trading post, he traveled to Edo.

He departed from Nagasaki on 31 December, on a ship with six fellow Dutchmen. They reached the capital on 7 February. As presents Van Tzum handed over spectacles, magnifying glasses, optical lenses, also ones that could be used in a darkroom, and medicines. On 12 February he met with Inoue Masashige.

In Edo, Van Tzum was asked if he had come to Edo with gifts to thank the shōgun for the release of the Dutch prisoners or if he had come to pay his respects in the usual manner. Van Tzum answered that he had come to do both, but this answer did not satisfy the bakufu. On 8 March Inoue informed van Tzum that the Dutch did not appear to adequately value the release of the Dutch prisoners.

Upon his return to Nagasaki, the chief factor was informed by the interpreters that Nanjing had been occupied by the Qing dynasty and that Zheng Zhilong had sent a request for military support to the bakufu. Two junks arrived in Nagasaki from Nanjing. The crew members of these junks had been forced to wear queues. The bakufu prohibited any dealings with ships from Nanjing.

Van Tzum succeeded in getting permission to export copper. He handed over the factory to his successor, Verstegen, on 7 October 1646. Three weeks later, on 27 October 1646, he left Japan.

=== Return ===
In January 1647 he left Batavia on the Haerlem. The ship was lost in a storm near Table Bay in March. Sixty men settled for one year on the mainland, but Van Tzum had sailed back earlier on one of the other two ships. Back in the Dutch republic he settled in Cornjum where he married in 1648. In 1654 he moved to IJlst and became a member of the vroedschap. His appointment as burgomaster by William Frederick, Prince of Nassau-Dietz was not without trouble. The next year he was elected as deputee to the States of Friesland and in 1658 in a board, checking the provincial finances.

Political offices
Preceded by ---	VOC Opperhoofden in Siam; 1643–1644	Succeeded by ---
Preceded by Pieter Overtwater	VOC Opperhoofd at Dejima; 1645–1646	Succeeded by Willem Verstegen
