= Terpensmole, IJlst =

Drainage mill in Friesland, Netherlands

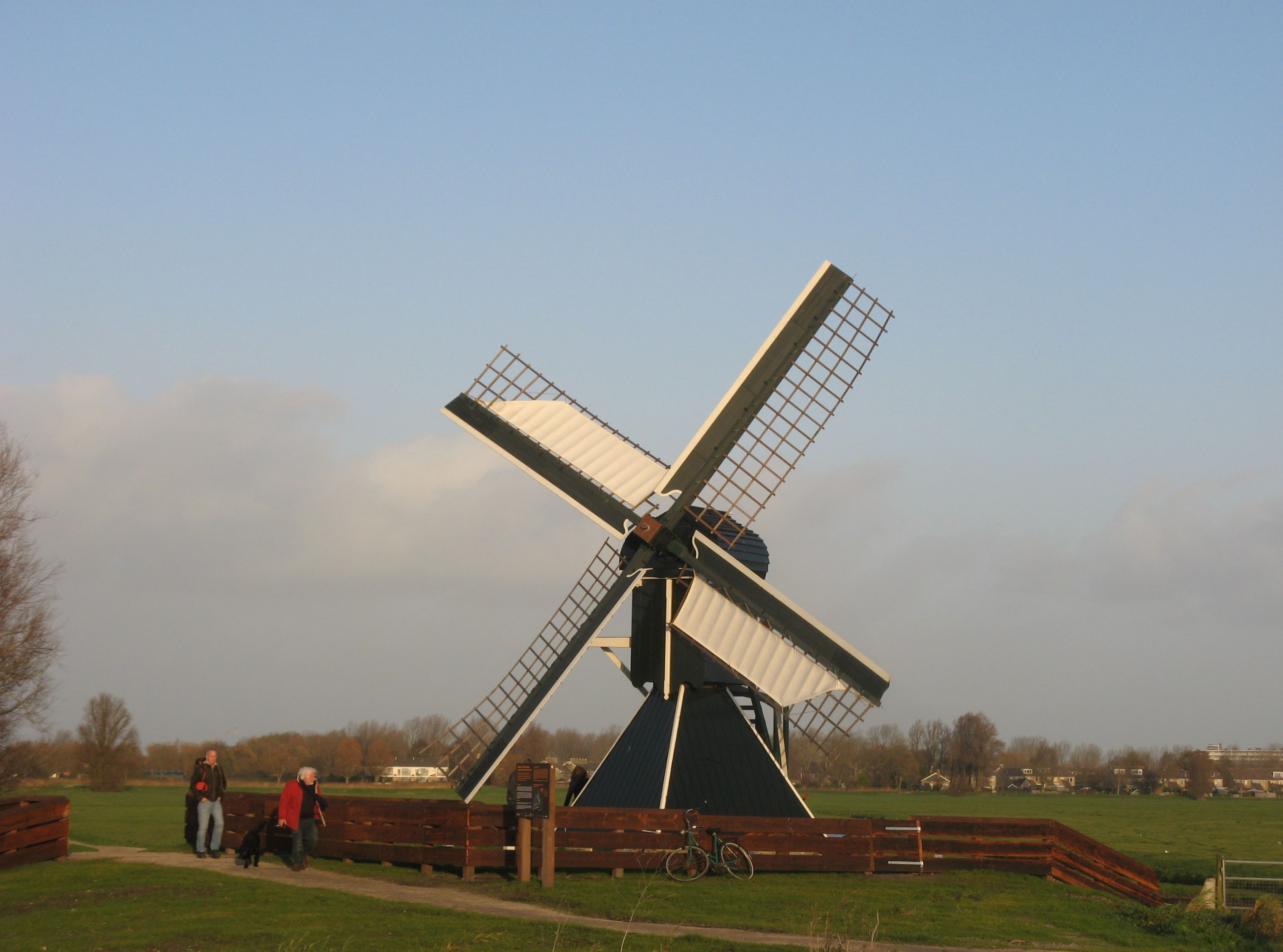
- Terpensmole in 2011

Origin
- Mill name: Terpensmole
- Mill location: IJlst, near De Rat
- Coordinates: 53°17′56.9″N 5°50′59″E
- Operator(s): Stichting De Fryske Mole
- Year built: 1982, moved to current location in 2011

Information
- Purpose: Drainage mill
- Type: Hollow post
- Roundhouse storeys: Single storey roundhouse
- No. of sails: Four sails
- Type of sails: Common sails
- Windshaft: Wood
- Winding: Tailpole and winch
- Type of pump: Archimedes' screw

The Terpensmole is a drainage mill in IJlst (West Frisian: Drylts), Friesland, Netherlands. It was moved from its earlier location in Sneek in 2011 where it was known as the Himmole. The mill is listed as a Rijksmonument, number 22914. It is fully functional and can be used to help drain the adjacent polder.

== History ==
The original windmill was built in the eighteenth century and located near Grou and called Minne Finne. The mill was moved to Sneek in 1982 and renamed Himmole, though the Minne Finne was in such a bad state of repair that its relocation was in fact a reconstruction with no or very few parts of the original windmill being reused. The new mill was also quite a bit larger than the old mill. The mill was built here as compensation for the loss of the windmill 't Op of Oppenhuizen (part of Sneek) that was moved to Koudum. The new location near Sneek deteriorated from growing trees, nearby buildings and a new road. In 2011 the windmill was moved again, this time to IJlst, only 300 metres from timber windmill De Rat. This is the location where the first Terpensmole was built some time before 1832 and stood into the twentieth century, so the moved mill has been given this historic name.

== Description ==
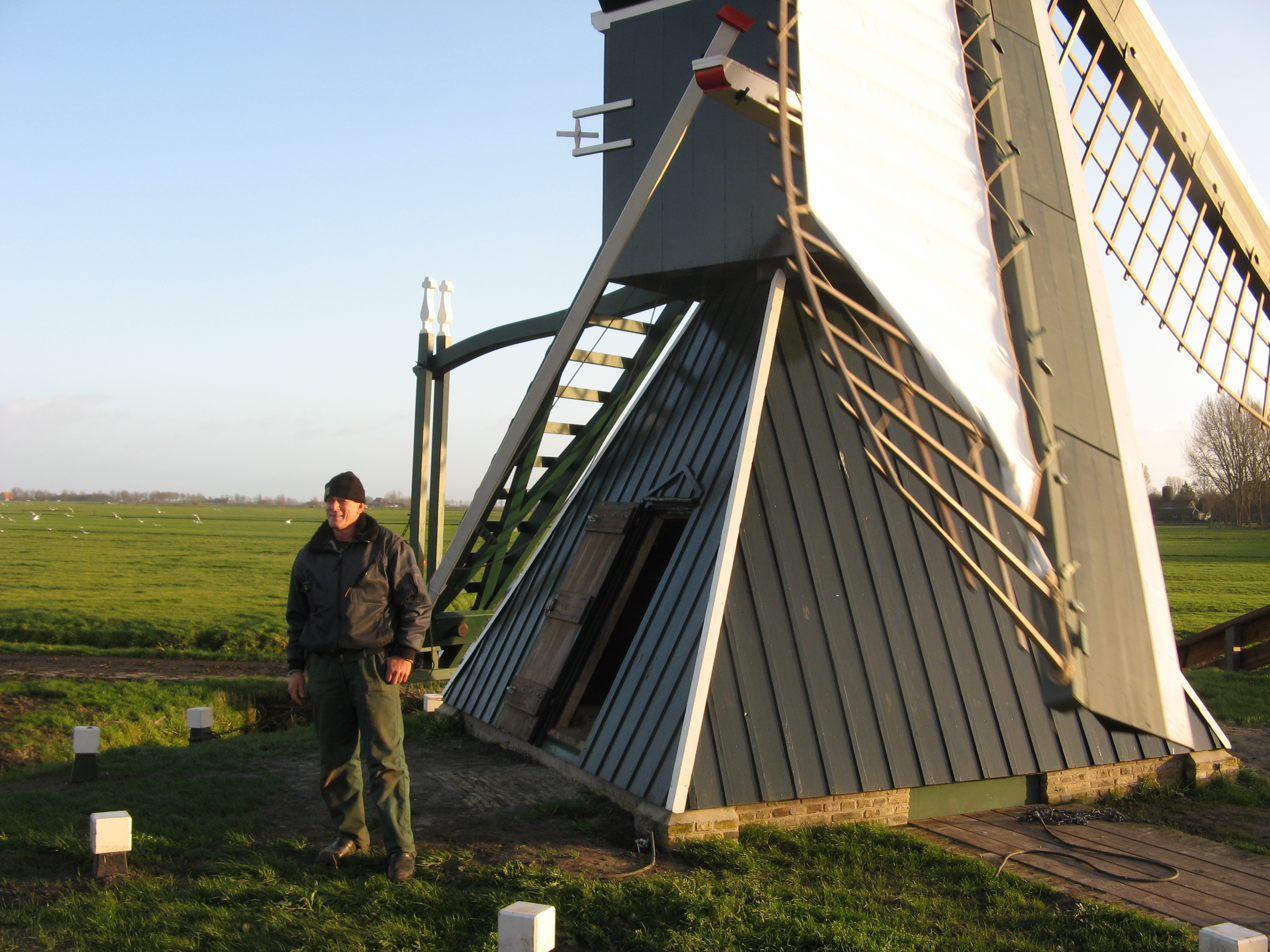
Mill and miller in November 2011

The Terpensmole is what the Dutch describe as a "spinnenkop". It is a small hollow post mill winded by a winch. The four common sails have a span of 12 metres (39 ft 4 in) and are carried on a wooden windshaft. Gears and the upright shaft bring the windpower to the Archimedes' screw which is 0.88 metres (2 ft 11 in) in diameter and can lift 140 litres (31 imp gal) of water per revolution.

== Public access ==
The mill is situated right next to a bicycle path and open to the public by appointment.
