= Ylostins =

Former stins in IJlst, Netherlands

Coordinates: 53°00′22″N 5°37′34″E

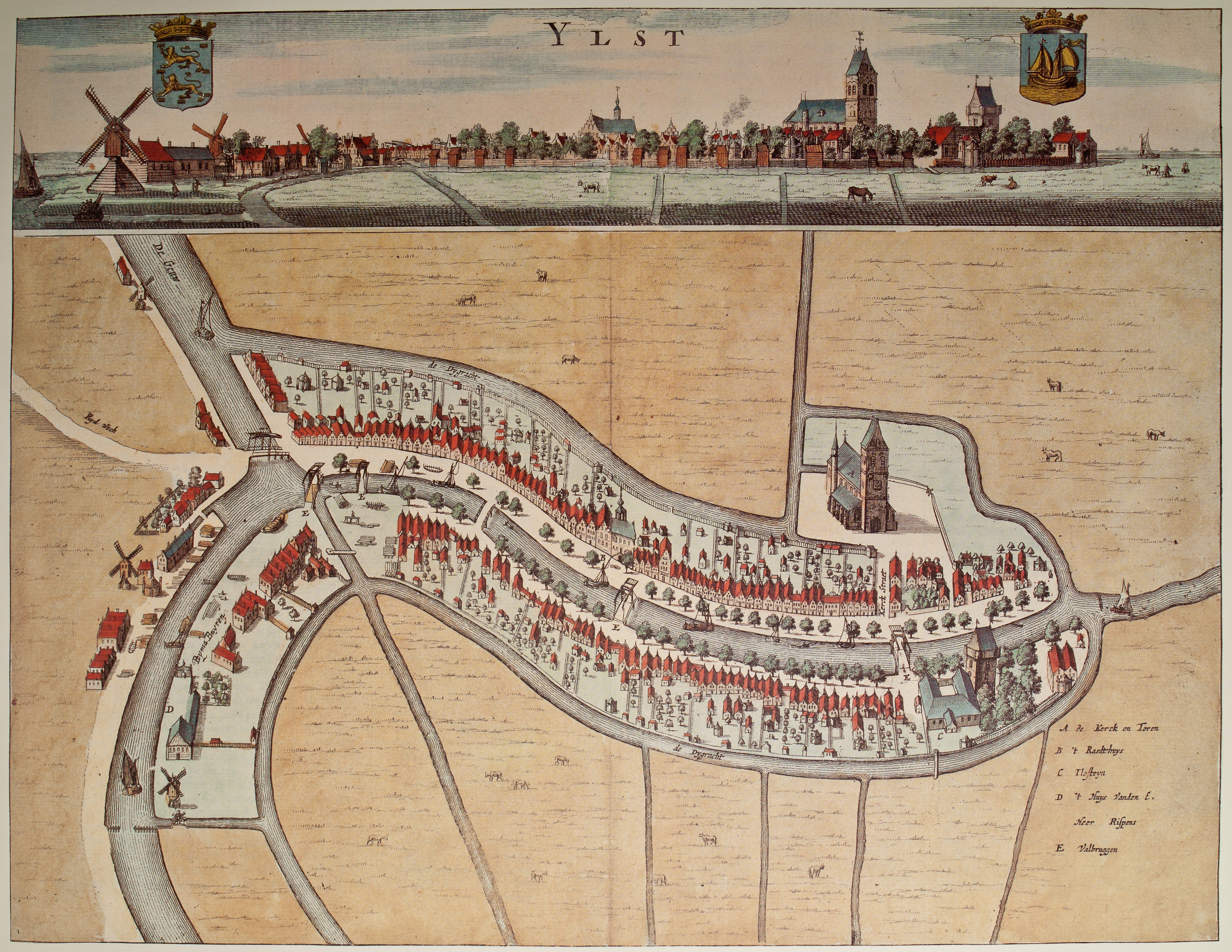
The Ylostins is depicted on right corner below: the tower, its big house and surrounded by tall elm trees

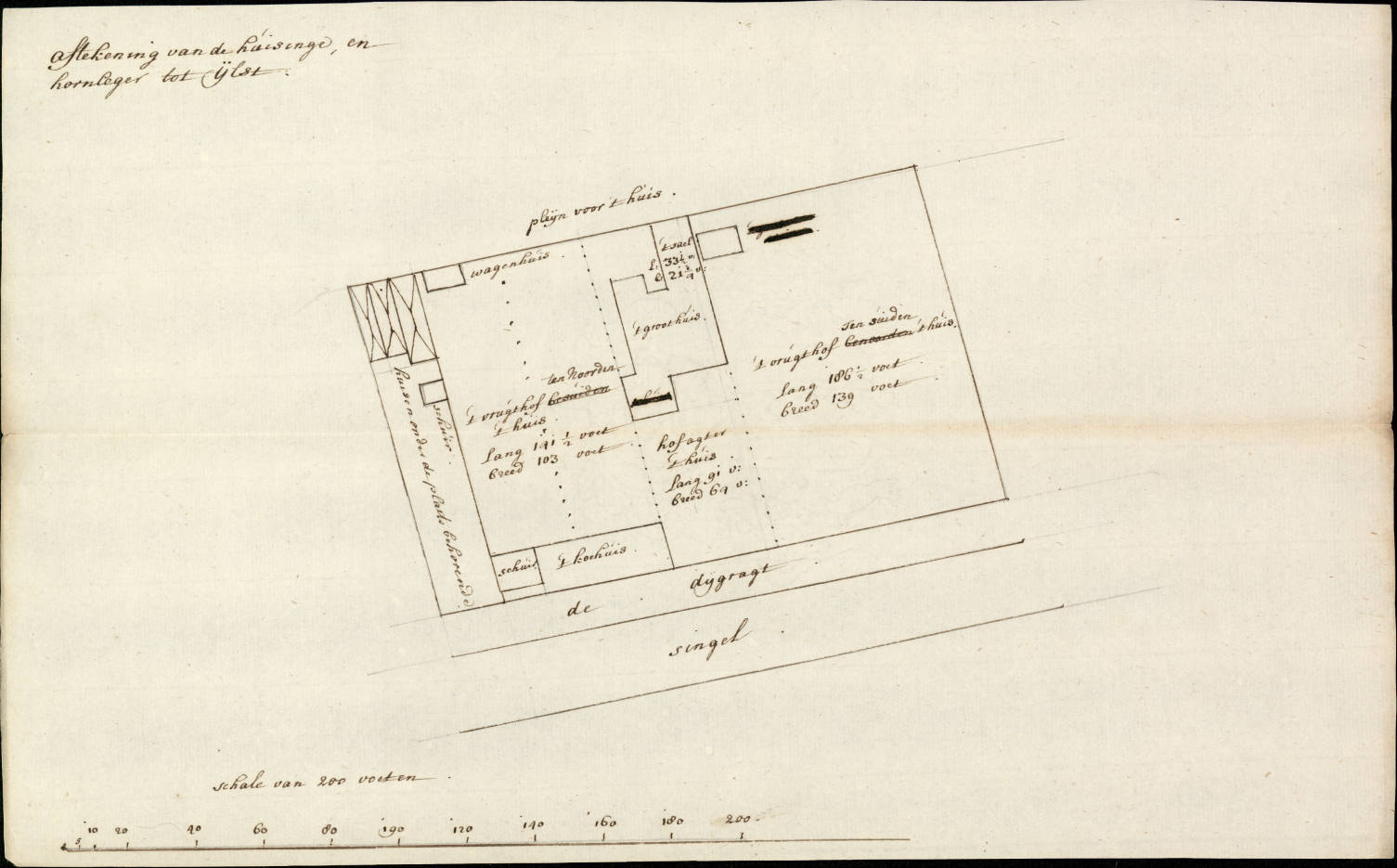
Plan of the Ylostins in 1711 depicting the tower and its immediate surroundings. The original is kept at Tresoar in Leeuwarden

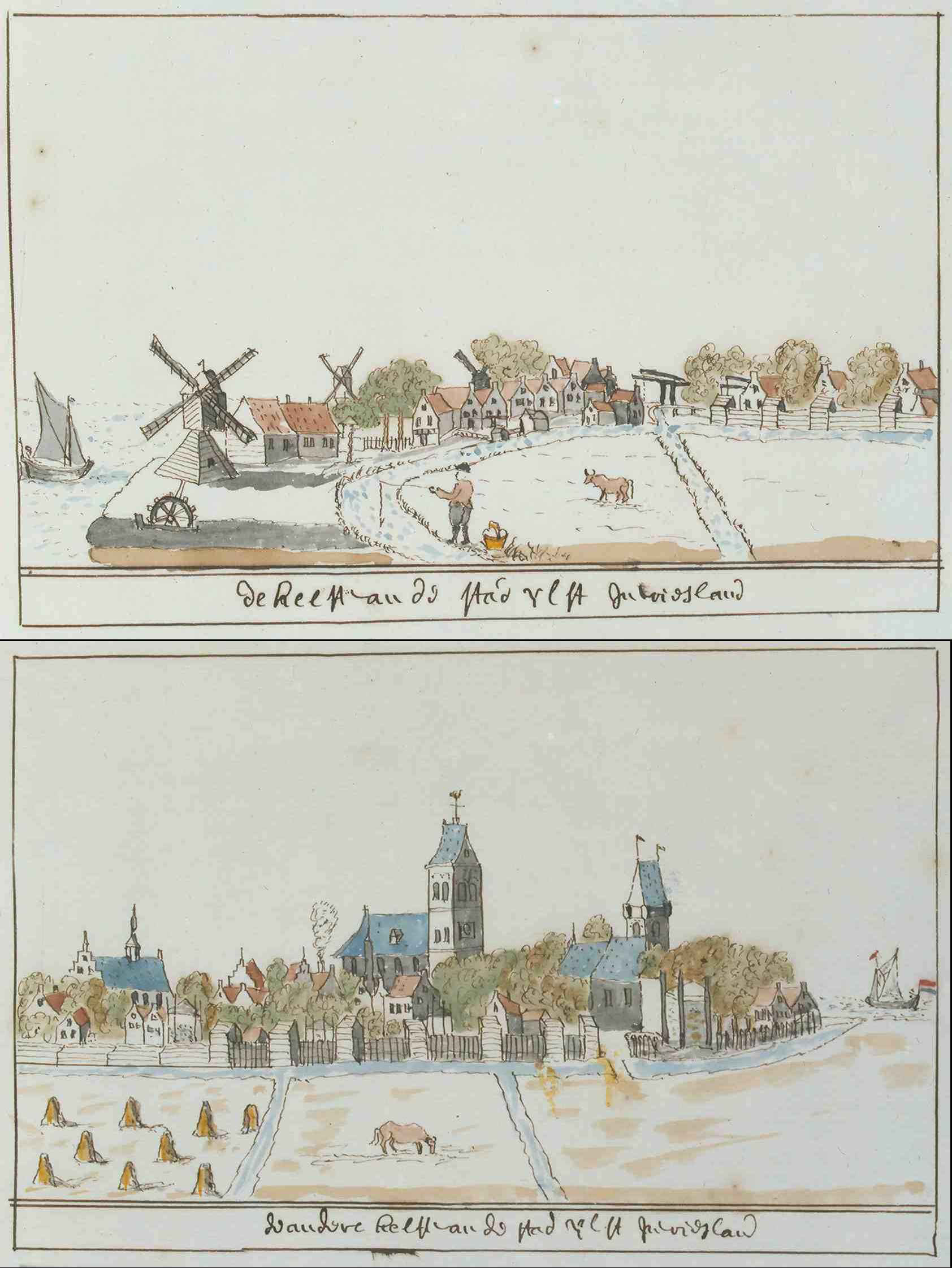
Image of the city of IJlst in the Atlas Schoemaker. Below right is the Ylostins (around 1710-1735

The Ylostins (or Ilostins) was a Frisian castle or a so-called stins in the city of IJlst, Friesland, Netherlands

== History ==
It is not clear whether the city of IJlst gave its name to the Ylostins, or whether it was the other way around. The Harinxma thoe IJlst family founded the Ylostins in the Middle Ages, probably around 1400. After the family, the castle was also called Harinxmastins. The Ylostins was on the south side of the city. Together with the church on the north side, it formed a defensible complex. The owner of the Ylostins was also the “eeheer or olderman” of IJlst. After the last Harinxma's died, the Ylostins came into the hands of local noble families such as Galama and Vegelin van Claerbergen, through inheritance and purchase and sale.

The Ylostins was a so-called tower house (Dutch: torenstins) like the still existing Skierstins. It consisted of a detached residential tower with bartizans at the top, with an U-shaped residential building next to it. The tower was additionally crowned with a hipped roof with decorative weather vanes. Small arched windows were installed in the walls. There also seem to have been painted windows, probably by the couple Tiete and Bernardina van Galama. If this is correct, then these windows may have been made by Julius van Galama, who married in IJlst in 1670. In terms of shape, the stins had great similarities with the Gruytermastins in Sneek.

Around 1710 the Ylostins still existed, but it was in a poor state of repair. After much deliberation, the owner, squire Hessel Vegelin van Claerbergen from Joure, decided to demolish the large tower in March 1711. The seven-metre-long beams were sold to farmers in the area. The state archives in Leeuwarden (Tresoar) still keep some documents relating to this, including a map of the Ylostins and its immediate surroundings. The map shows the tower, the big house and other structures, surrounded by tall elm trees. The last remains of the Ylostins were demolished in 1778.

In the 1960s there were excavations (led by Herre Halbertsma) at the place where the Ylostins were suspected. However, the demolition was thorough and nothing has been found of the foundations. They found only soft ground with no debris.

The residential center for the elderly in IJlst is named after the castle: 'Nij Ylostins'.

== Literature ==
- Mr. S.J. Fockema Andreae en Dr. G. Bakker (1968). IJlst 1268 - 1968 (Sudwesthoeke-Rige Nr. 5). Bolsward/ Leeuwarden: A.J. Osinga NV/ Fryske Akademy. p. 72.
- Ronald Elward en Peter Karstkarel (1990). Stinsen en States Adellijk wonen in Friesland. Drachten Leeuwarden: Friese Pers Boekerij bv. p. 176. ISBN 978-9033002342.
- Herre Halbertsma (4 July 1968). "Oudheidkundig onderzoek: graven in IJlster bodem levert gemeente 5 graven op: geen resten van Sint-Mauritiuskerk en stins". Sneeker Nieuwsblad.
