= Carel Reyniersz =

Dutch Governor-General of the VOC

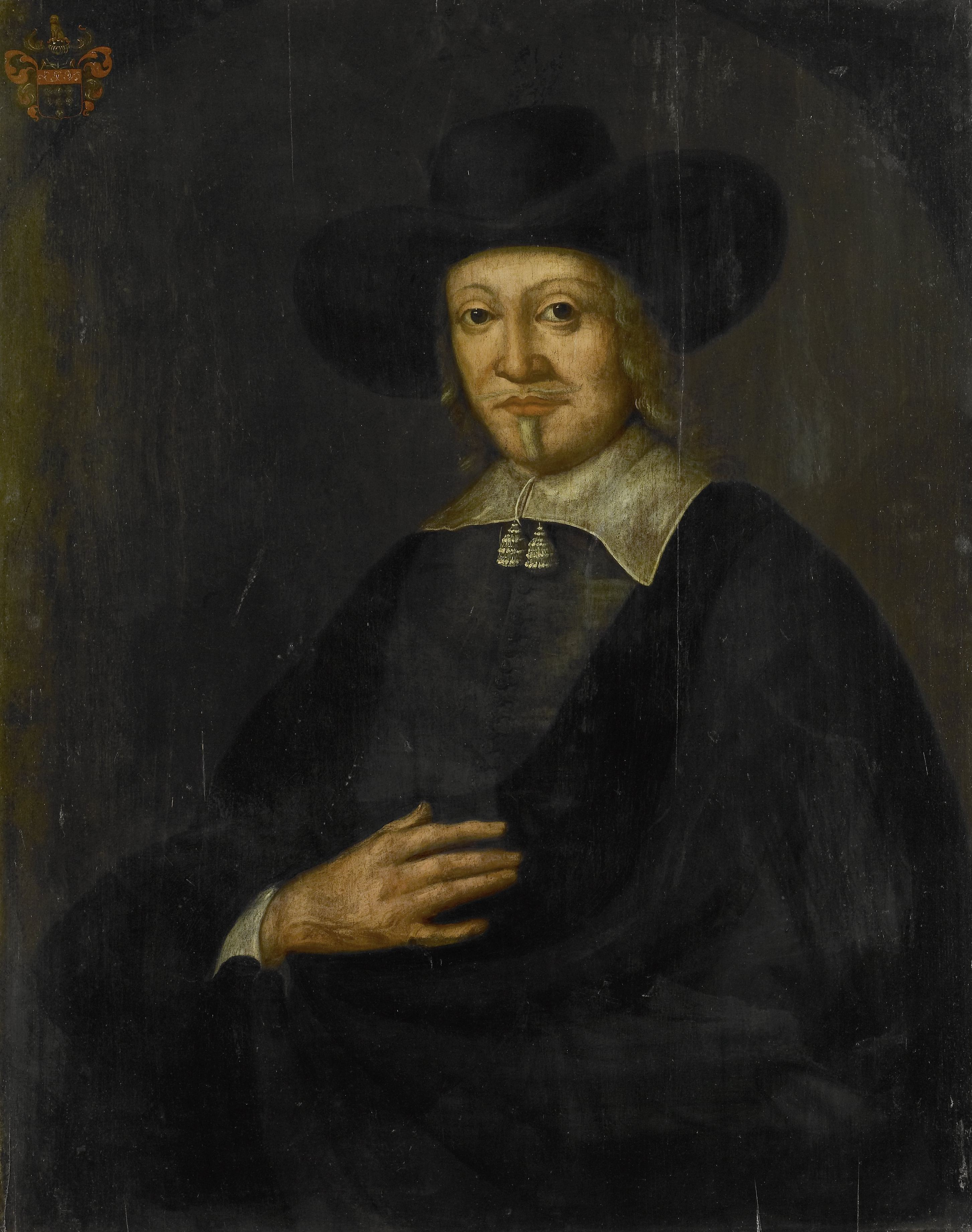
- Portrait of Carel Reyniersz

11th Governor-General of the Dutch East Indies
- In office 1650–1653
- Preceded by: Cornelis van der Lijn
- Succeeded by: Joan Maetsuycker

Personal details
- Born: 1604 Amsterdam, Dutch Republic
- Died: 1653 (aged 48–49) Batavia, Dutch East Indies
- Occupation: Colonial governor

Carel Reyniersz (1604–1653) was Governor-General of the Dutch East Indies from 1650 until 1653.

Reyniersz (or Reiniersz) was born in Amsterdam in 1604 (or perhaps 1602). He left for the Indies in 1627 as Upperbuyer (opperkoopman) on the Dutch Coromandel (Tamil Nadu). He was promoted to Governor of the Coromandel Coast in 1635, even though he had been accused of engaging in (forbidden) private/personal trading. In 1636 he became Counsellor-extraordinary (Raad extra-ordinair) of the Dutch Council of the Indies. He returned to Amsterdam as Admiral of the returning fleet in 1638 and established himself as a merchant there. However, he lost his entire fortune, so left again, this time aboard the Salamander, for India on 24 April 1645. He arrived there on 3 December 1645. The following year, 1646, he became a full Counsellor of the Indies.

His allocated task was to carry out a new policy in the Indies. Most importantly, he was, as far as possible to eliminate sources of competition. He was to take action against private trading and to deal with too much production of spices by having trees cut down. Reinier stuck strictly to this policy, which led to much conflict in West Ceram, where the population would not accept the destruction of their plantations. It took until 1658 for the area to be pacified.

Four years after Reyniersz become a Counsellor, Governor-General Cornelis van der Lijn received an honorable discharge (sic) and on 26 April 1650, Reyniersz was named his successor, a task he very much looked forward to. Four years later he was dismissed. The governors of the company were not pleased by the weakness of his rule. There still exists in the Netherlands his letter of dismissal. It indicates he was being dismissed because he had been unable to carry out the duties of his office, particularly maintaining peace. The letter was never sent, because Reynier had already written to the Seventeen Lords (Heren XVII) asking to be relieved of his office on health grounds. This letter arrived just before his dismissal letter was to be sent. The Seventeen Lords willingly agreed to his request, though he died before their response reached him, on the night of 18/19 May 1653. He was buried in Batavia, Dutch East Indies and was succeed as Governor-General by Joan Maetsuycker.

== Sources ==
- Dutch site on the East India Company via Wayback Machine accessed 2025-04-23
- Encyclopaedie van Nederlandsch-Indië, Part N–Soek
- Putten, L. P. van, 2002. Ambitie en onvermogen: gouverneurs-generaal van Nederlands-Indië 1610–1796.
- http://www.bezuidenhout.nl
