= Pieter Anthoniszoon Overtwater =

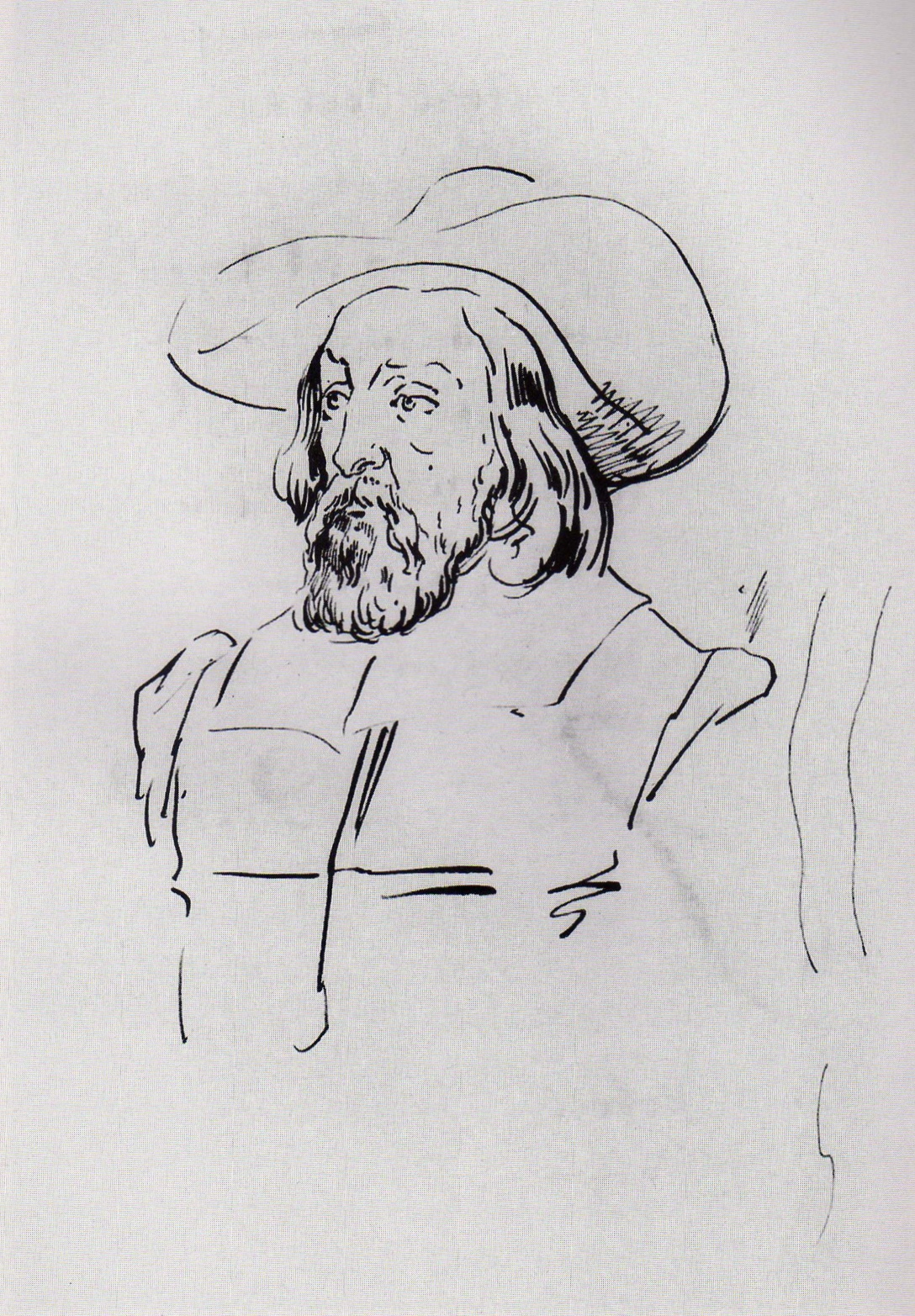
- pen drawing, likely of Overtwater

9th Governor of Formosa
- In office 1646–1649
- Preceded by: François Caron
- Succeeded by: Nicolas Verburg

Personal details
- Born: c. 1610 Hoorn, Dutch Republic
- Died: 28 or 29 April 1682 Batavia, Dutch East Indies

Pieter Anthoniszoon Overtwater, also known as Anthonisz. or over 't Water (c. 1610 – 28 or 29 April 1682), was a merchant/trader and official of the Dutch East India Company (Vereenigde Oost-Indische Compagnie or VOC).

== Career ==
Overtwater joined the VOC in 1640. Before this, he was a conrector of a school in Hoorn and had no commercial experience.

He was the Dutch opperhoofd at Dejima in Japan from October 1642 to August 1643, and again from November 1644 to November 1645. He proposed to start a new factorij in the north of Japan, an unacceptable proposal for the Japanese interpreter, who refused to translate it. The Japanese however were interested to learn how to use a mortar, but Overtwater was not very willing to explain.

He was Governor of Formosa from 1646 to 1649 and criticized. The east coast of Formosa was left by the company, being unprofitable and dangerous.

He was stationed in Ceylon and in 1666 in the Cape colony, where he proposed that children of Malabar slaves could be baptized. In 1677, he was fired as an extraordinary council in Batavia, being accused of corruption or unfair trade.

== See also ==
- VOC Opperhoofden in Japan

Political offices
Preceded by Jan van Elseracq	VOC Opperhoofd at Dejima; 1642-1643	Succeeded by Jan van Elseracq
Preceded by Jan van Elseracq	VOC Opperhoofd at Dejima; 1644–1645	Succeeded by Renier van Tzum
Preceded by François Caron	VOC Governor of Formosa; 1646–1650	Succeeded by Nicolas Verburg
