= Maximiliaan le Maire =

Dutch merchant and trader

Maximiliaan le Maire (28 February 1606 in Amsterdam – c. 1654 in prob. Batavia) was a merchant/trader and official of the Dutch East India Company (Vereenigde Oost-Indische Compagnie or VOC).

== Early life ==
Maximilaan was one of the surviving 13 or 14 children of Isaac le Maire, in 1602 one of the founders of the Dutch East India Company or "VOC", and Maria Walraven, and was a brother of the explorer and circumnavigator Jacob le Maire (1585-1616). He grew up in Egmond aan den Hoef.

== Career ==
Le Maire served for the VOC starting around 1630 in Malabar followed by Moçambique and Hirado. He was the Dutch Opperhoofd at Dejima from 14 February 1641 to 30 October 1641. He was the first "new" chief trader at the island outpost.

From 1643 to 1644 he was Governor of Formosa (Taiwan), where a polder was named after him.

He returned home, and in 1647 remarried, in The Hague, Geertruij van Mierop. For a couple of years, he lived in Amsterdam, but in 1650 he left again for Batavia with his wife. He died after a few years; it is not known exactly where and when. His widow went back to the Netherlands and in September 1656 remarried Cornelis van der Lijn, previously a governor of the Indies and from 1668 burgomaster of Alkmaar.

== See also ==
- VOC Opperhoofden in Japan

Political offices
Preceded by François Caron	VOC Opperhoofden at Dejima; 1641	Succeeded by Jan van Elseracq
Preceded by Paulus Traudenius	VOC Governor of Formosa; 1643–1644	Succeeded by François Caron
