= IJlst =

IJlst Drylts
- City
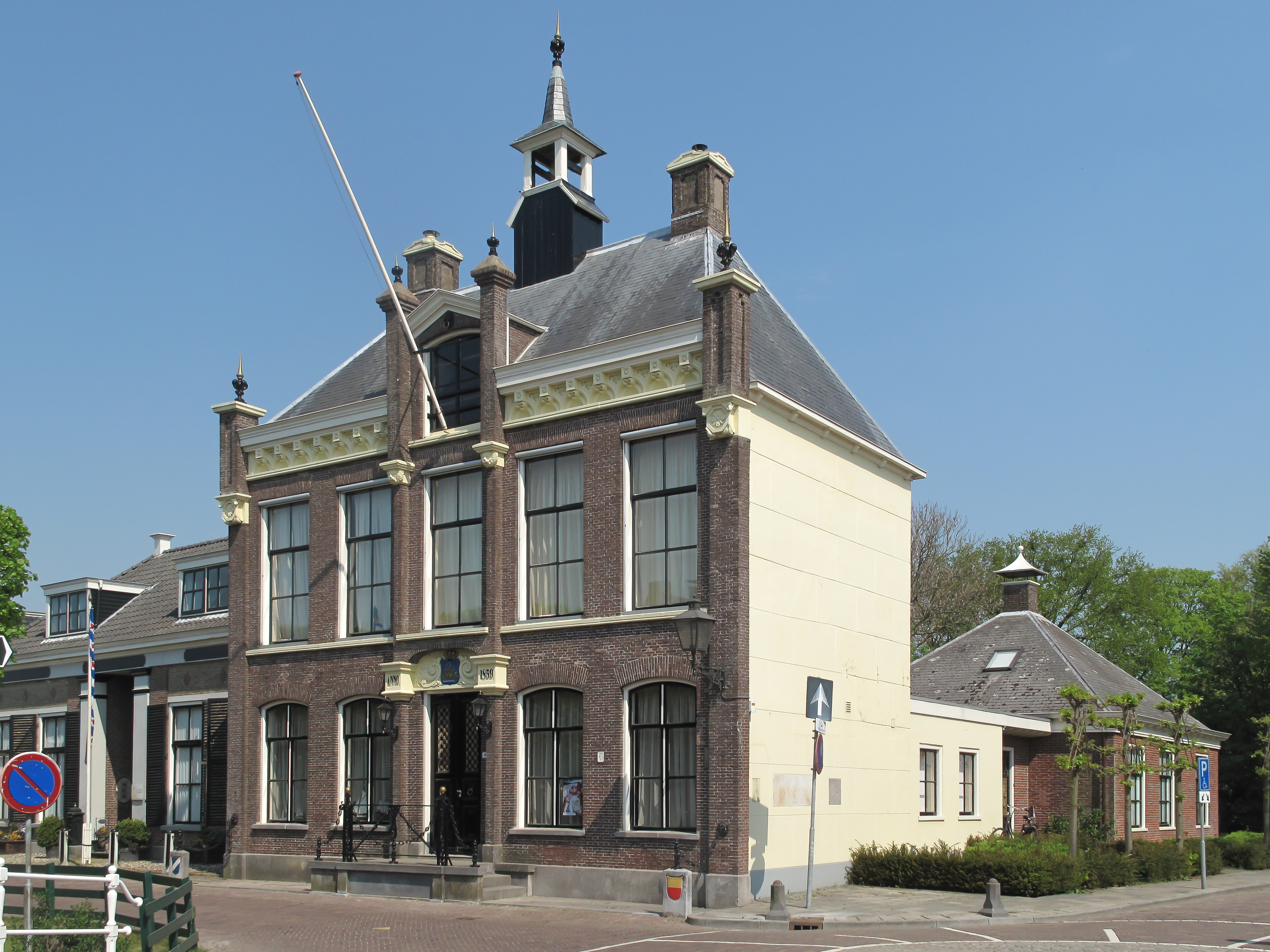
- Former Town Hall

- Flag Coat of arms

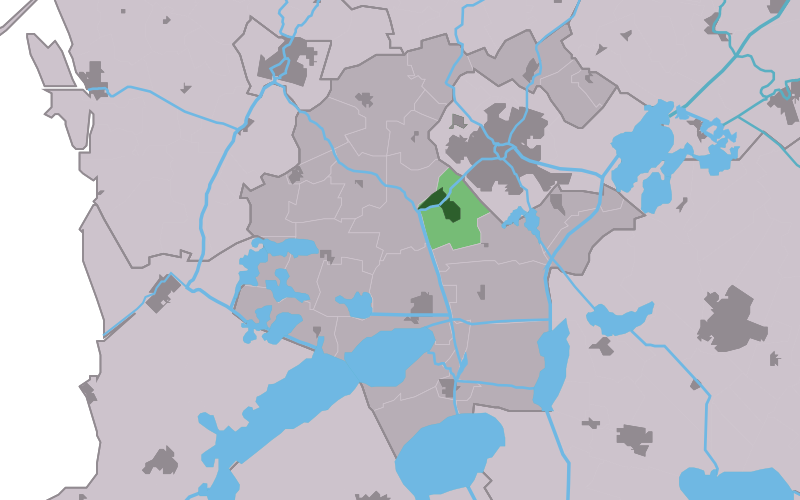
- Location in the former Wymbritseradiel municipality

- Location in the Netherlands IJlst (Netherlands)
- Country: Netherlands
- Province: Friesland
- Municipality: Súdwest-Fryslân

Population (2017)
  - Total: 3,140
- Time zone: UTC+1 (CET)
  - Summer (DST): UTC+2 (CEST)
- Postal code: 8651
- Telephone area: 0515

IJlst (Dutch pronunciation: [ɛilst]; West Frisian: Drylts pronounced [drilts]) is a city in Friesland, Netherlands. It is located about 3 km southwest of Sneek. It lies within the municipality of Súdwest-Fryslân and had a population of approximately 3,140 in January 2017.

== History ==
It received city rights in 1268 and is one of the eleven cities in Friesland. It was the fourth city receiving city rights after Stavoren, Hindeloopen and Harlingen. The city was well known for its excellent location in local trade and its shipbuilding industry. When the Middelzee silted up, the importance of trade declined and the city focused on its shipbuilding industry. The city had its own castle, a so-called stins, named the Ylostins.

Between 1654 and 1664, Renier van Tzum was burgomaster of IJlst. Van Tzum was the opperhoofd or chief factor of the Dutch East India Company (Vereenigde Oost-Indische Compagnie or VOC) in Siam (1643–1644). He was also VOC opperhoofd in Japan (1644–1646).

Before 2011, the city was part of the Wymbritseradiel municipality and before 1984 IJlst was an independent municipality.

== Name ==
The name IJlst derives from the name of the river IJ or Ey. The river IJ is the central point of the little city. IJlst has a railway station located between the cities of Sneek and Stavoren.

== Gallery ==
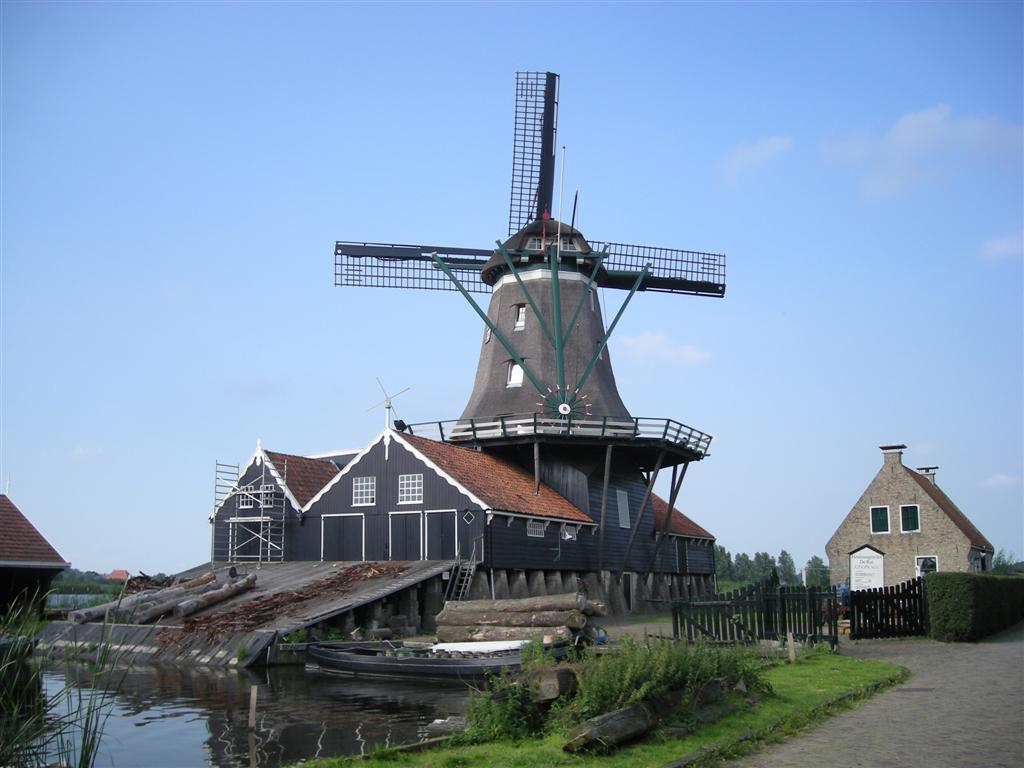
Windmill De Rat (2007)

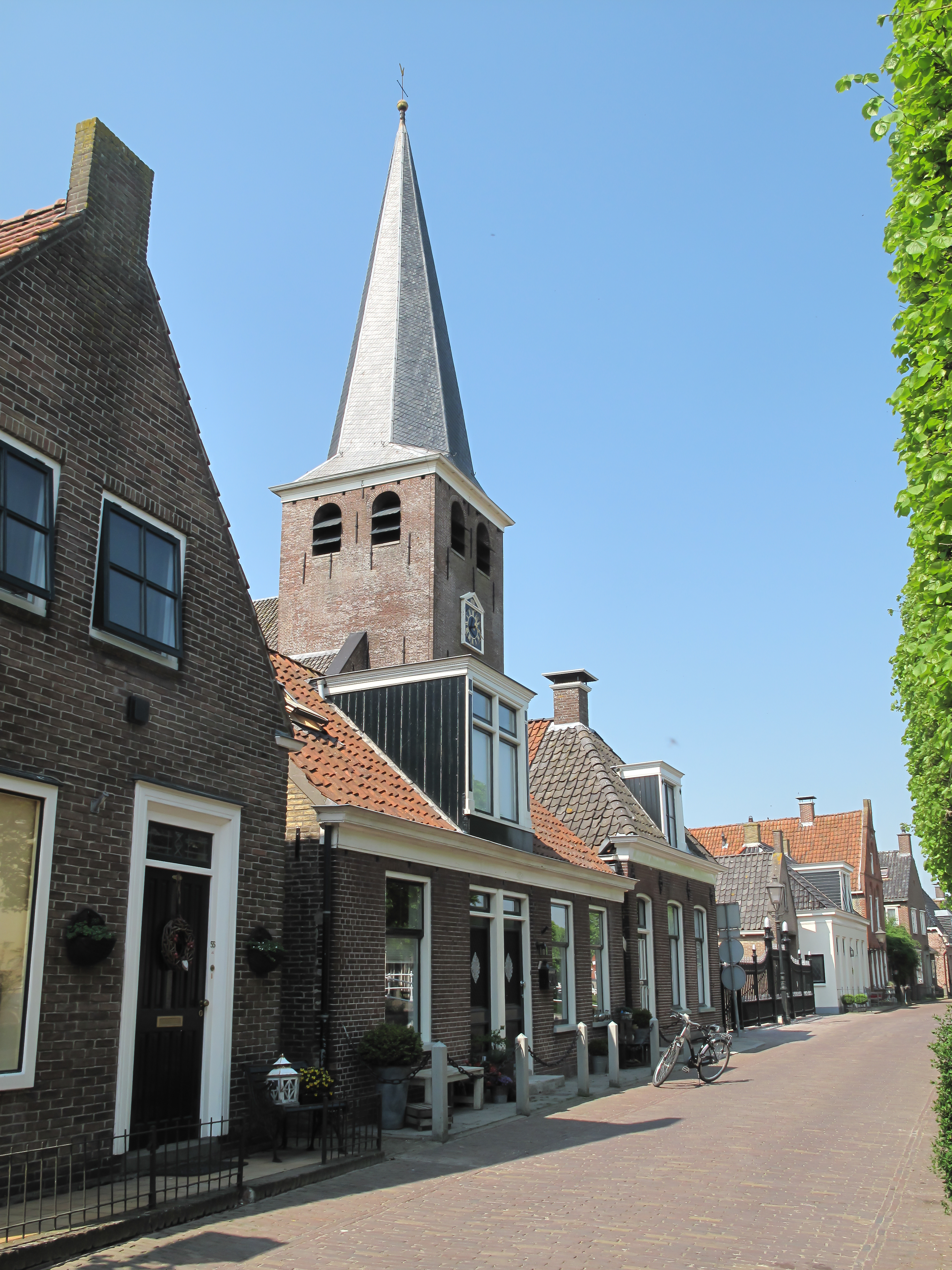
Mauritius Church (2011)

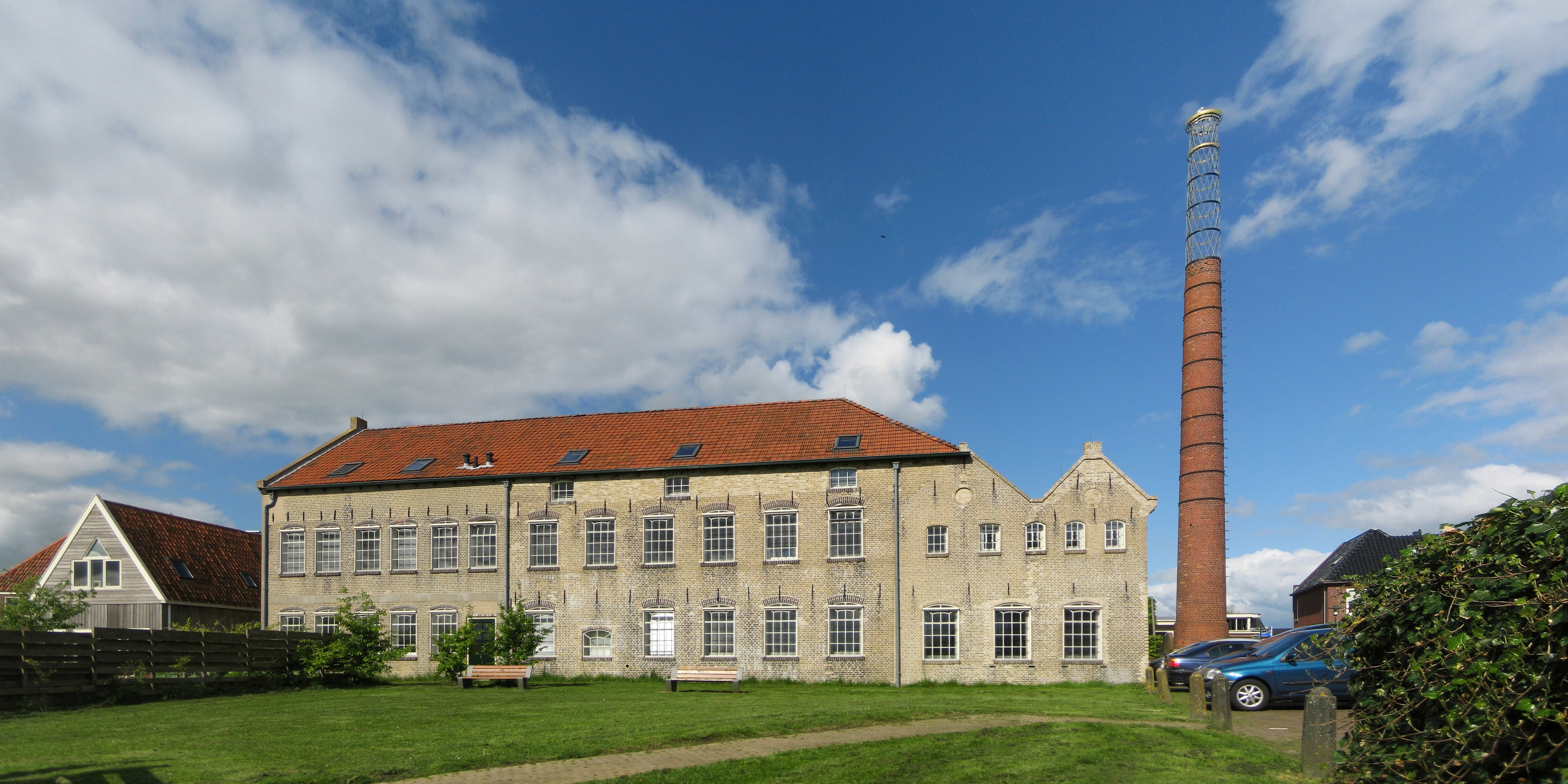
Former factory Nooitgedagt (2014)

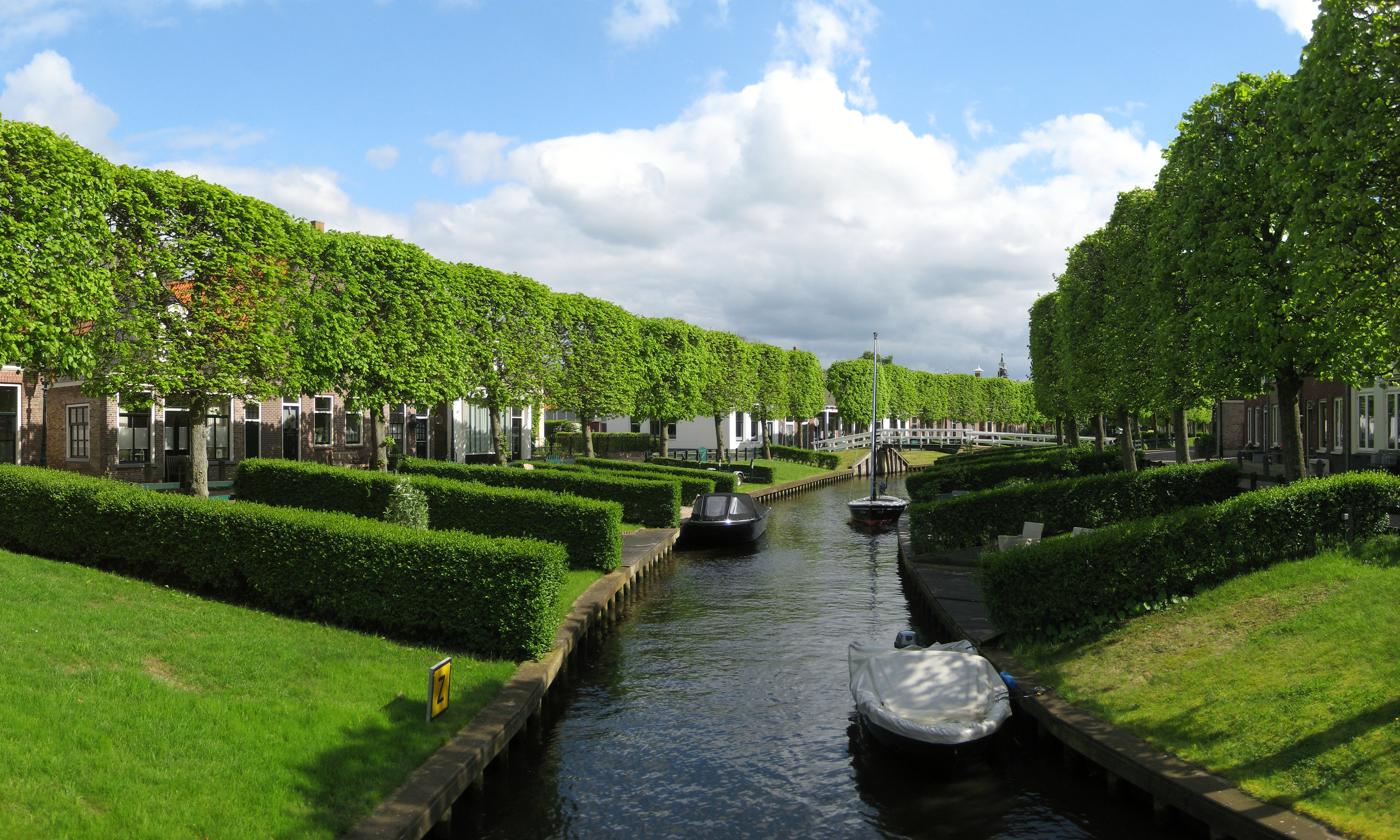
The river Ie (Dutch: Ee) (2014)
