= De Rat, IJlst =

Windmill in IJlst, Netherlands

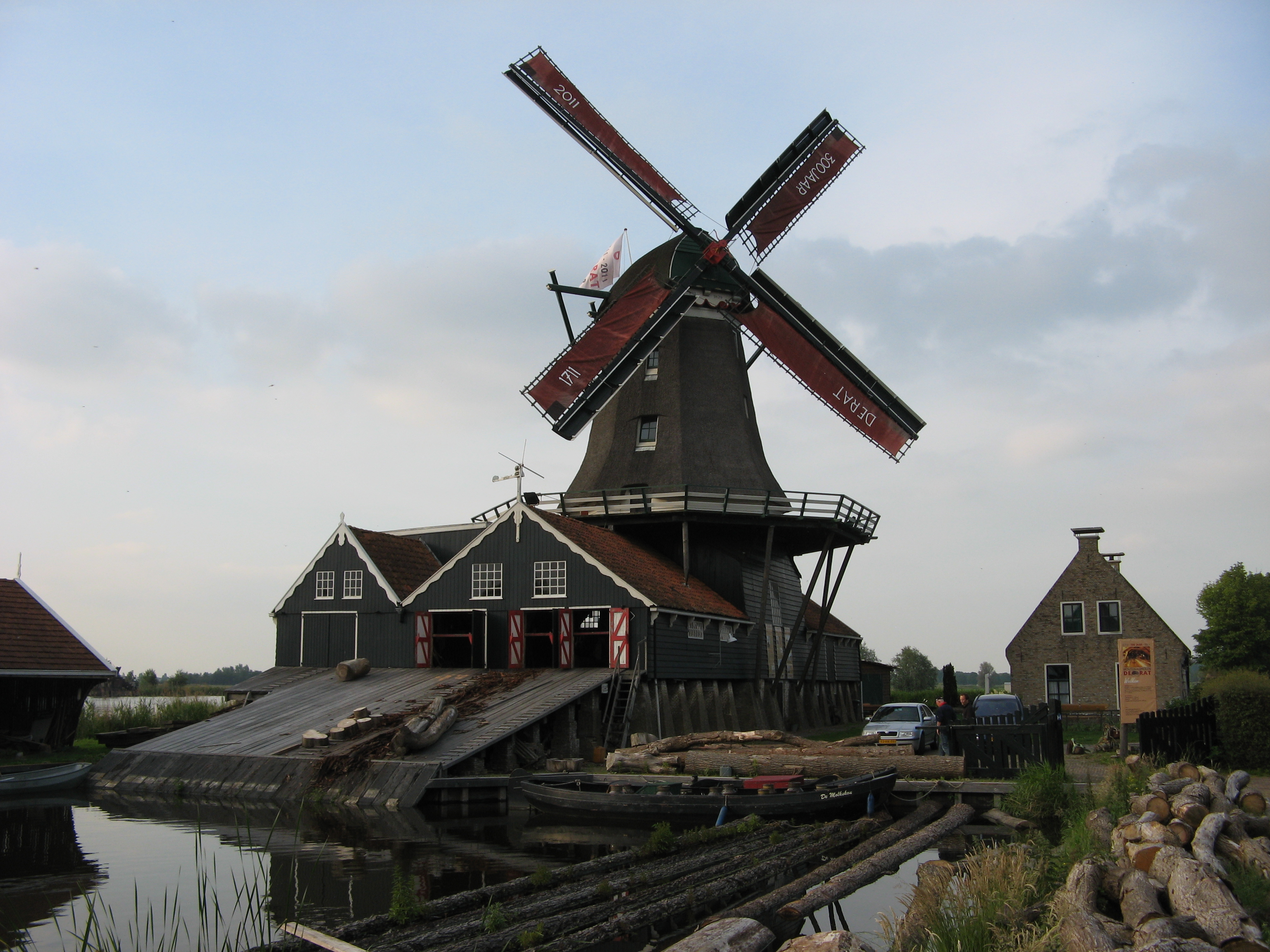
- De Rat, June 2011, 300 years old

Origin
- Mill name: De Rat
- Mill location: Sneekerpad 16, 8651 NE, IJlst
- Coordinates: 53°00′46″N 5°37′37″E
- Operator(s): Stichting Houtzaagmolen De Rat
- Year built: 1828

Information
- Purpose: Sawmill, formerly also a Corn mill
- Type: Smock mill
- Storeys: Two-storey smock
- Base storeys: Three-storey base
- Smock sides: Eight sides
- No. of sails: Four sails
- Type of sails: Common sails, leading edges on the Fok system
- Windshaft: Cast iron
- Winding: Tailpole and winch
- Auxiliary power: Electric motor
- Type of saw: Vertical frame saws

De Rat (English: The Rat) is a smock mill in IJlst, Friesland, Netherlands, which was originally built in the seventeenth century at Zaanstreek, North Holland. In 1828 it was moved to IJlst, where it worked using wind power until 1920 and then by electric motor until 1950. The mill was bought by the town of IJlst in 1956 and restored in the mid-1960s. Further restoration in the mid-1970s returned the mill to full working order. De Rat is working for trade and is used as a training mill. The mill is listed as a Rijksmonument (No. 39880).

== History ==
De Rat was originally built in the seventeenth century in the Zaanstreek area of North Holland. It was known there as De Walrot (English: The Water Rat) which was generally shortened to De Rot. Earlier it was thought the mill was in existence in 1683 but archival research, dendrochronology and an inscription in an old beam show the mill was actually built in 1711.

Following the Napoleonic Wars, the mill fell out of use. At the same time, agriculture in Friesland was enjoying a boom, with many farms being built or having their old buildings replaced, creating a demand for sawn timber. In 1828, De Watterrot was bought at auction by William Ringnalda and Hessel Aten Vellinga. It was dismantled and shipped across the Zuiderzee to IJlst, where it was named De Rat. In 1852, the mill was in the joint ownership of Jan Janszoon Ringnalda and his wife Boukje Hessels; and Gerben Ringnalda and his wife Johanna Hartgerink. In 1854, the firm of H A Ringnalda & Co was formed. The Leeuwarden Courant reported that the mill was also a flour mill at this time.

In 1859, the mill was purchased by Walle Melisz Oppendijk, who was related to the Ringnalda family via William Ringnalda's marriage to Richtje Oppendijk. This year saw the last mention of the mill also being a corn mill. By 1868, it had reverted to being solely a saw mill. Oppendijk now owned two sawmills. The other mill was burnt down in 1873 and rebuilt as a steam powered sawmill in 1874. In the second half of the 19th Century, De Rat was known for the high quality of timber produced. In 1918, a 30 horsepower (22 kW) electric motor was installed. The cap, sails and stage were removed in 1920, and the mill was then worked entirely by electricity.

The mill closed in 1950. On 5 December 1955, then-owners NV Houthandel asked for permission to demolish the mill. In April 1956 it was reported that the mill was not in bad condition. It was recommended that permission to demolish it be refused and that the town of IJlst take over the mill. On 17 September 1956, De Rat was purchased by the town for ƒ3,000.

In 1966, the mill was restored by millwright J D Medendorp of Zuidlaren, Drenthe. The cap and brake wheel came from a drainage mill at Scheemderzwaag, Groningen, which had been demolished in 1959. The windshaft came from the Monnikenmolen, Sint Jansklooster, Overijssel. The mill was used to house a pottery and afterwards was used by a sailing school. Between 1976 and 1980, the mill was restored to working order. The work was done by millwrights Tacona BV of Stiens. The fully restored mill was officially reopened on 27 May 1978. Further restoration work was carried out in 1987 and 1996. In 2005, a new cap was made for the mill, replacing the one fitted in 1966 and replicating the original cap in appearance. The new cap was fitted on 19 April 2005.

Ownership of the mill now lies with the Gemeente Wymbritseradiel, while the mill is operated by Stichting Houtzaagmolen De Rat (English: Wood saw mill De Rat Society). The mill is used as a training mill by the Gild Fryske Mounders (English: Frisian Millers' Guild).

== Description ==
De Rat is what the Dutch describe as a "stellingmolen" . It is a three-storey smock mill on a three-storey base. The stage is at second-floor level, 7.60 metres (24 ft 11 in) above ground level. The smock and cap are thatched. The mill is winded by tailpole and winch. The sails are Common sails, fitted with leading edges on the Fok System. They have a span of 21.48 metres (70 ft 6 in). The sails are carried on a cast-iron windshaft, which was cast by Zallinda of Zwolle, Overijssel. The windshaft also carries the brake wheel, which has 59 cogs. This drives the wallower (29 cogs) at the top of the upright shaft. At the bottom of the upright shaft, a crown wheel with 43 cogs drives a crankshaft via a gear with 40 cogs. The crankshaft converts the circular motion into the reciprocal motion for three vertical frame saws. The mill can handle logs up to 27.60 metres (90 ft 7 in) long.

== Sawyers ==
Zaanstreek

- Cornelis Gijs (1683- )
- Jan Janszoon Koningh ( -1707)
- Jan IJsbrandsz Koningh (1707–27)
- Koningh family
- IJsbrand Koningh ( -1805)
- Jacob Schippers (1810- )

IJlst

- William Hotzes Ringnalda (1828- )
- Jan Janszoon te Velde (1852–54)
- Gerben Ringnalda (1952–54)
- H A Ringnalda & Co (1854–91)
- Wed. W.J. Oppedijk (1891- )
- NV Houthandel ( -1950)

References for above:-

== Public access ==
De Rat is open to the public on Saturdays between 09:00 and 17:00. From May to September, the mill is also open on Wednesday, Thursday and Friday from 12:00 to 17:00.
