= Jan van Elseracq =

Jan van Elseracq, also known as Jan van Eserack, was a merchant/trader and official of the Dutch East India Company (Vereenigde Oost-Indische Compagnie or VOC).

== Career ==
Van Elseracq was the VOC opperhoofd starting 1 November 1641 and ending 29 October 1642. During this period, there were about 20 men at the VOC factory. He was in Edo from December 4, 1641, to March 12, 1642.

He was also head of the VOC trading post from 8 November 1643 to 24 November 1644. He was in Edo for a second time in December 1643.

== Breskens affair ==
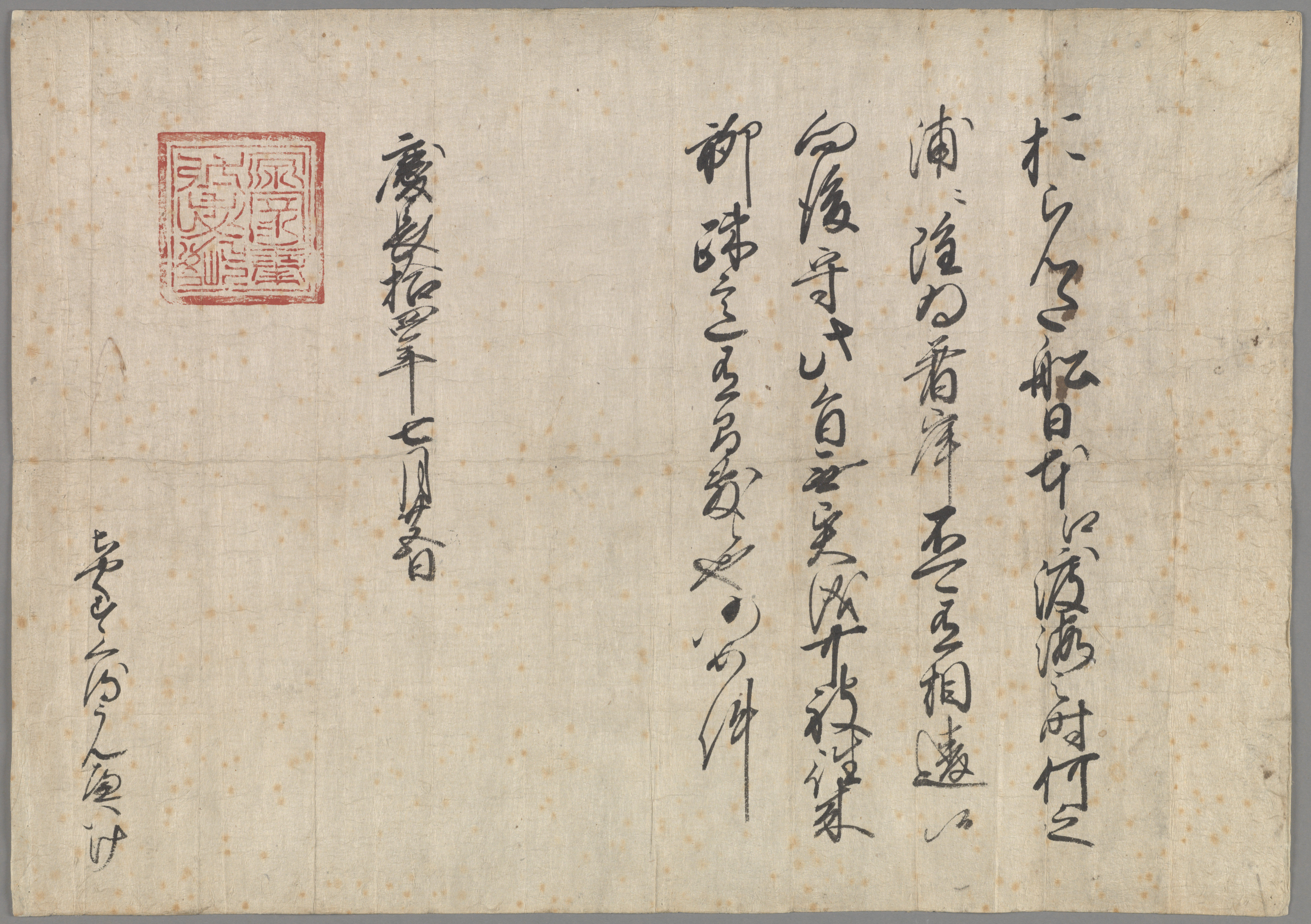
The "trade pass" (Dutch: handelspas) issued in the name of Tokugawa Ieyasu. The text commands: "Dutch ships are allowed to travel to Japan, and they can disembark on any coast, without any reserve. From now on this regulation must be observed, and the Dutch left free to sail where they want throughout Japan. No offenses to them will be allowed, such as on previous occasions" – dated August 24, 1609 (Keichō 14, 25th day of the 6th month); n.b., the goshuin (御朱印) identifies this as an official document bearing the shogun's scarlet seal.

Van Elseracq was in Japan when sailors from the Dutch ship Breskens were imprisoned by the Tokugawa shogunate. He played an important role in negotiating their release.

== See also ==
- VOC Opperhoofden in Japan

Political offices
Preceded by Maximiliaen Le Maire	VOC Opperhoofd at Dejima; 1641-1642	Succeeded by Pieter Overtwater
Preceded by Pieter Overtwater	VOC Opperhoofd at Dejima; 1643-1644	Succeeded by Pieter Overtwater
