= Cornelis van der Lijn =

Dutch East Indies Governor-General from 1646 to 1650

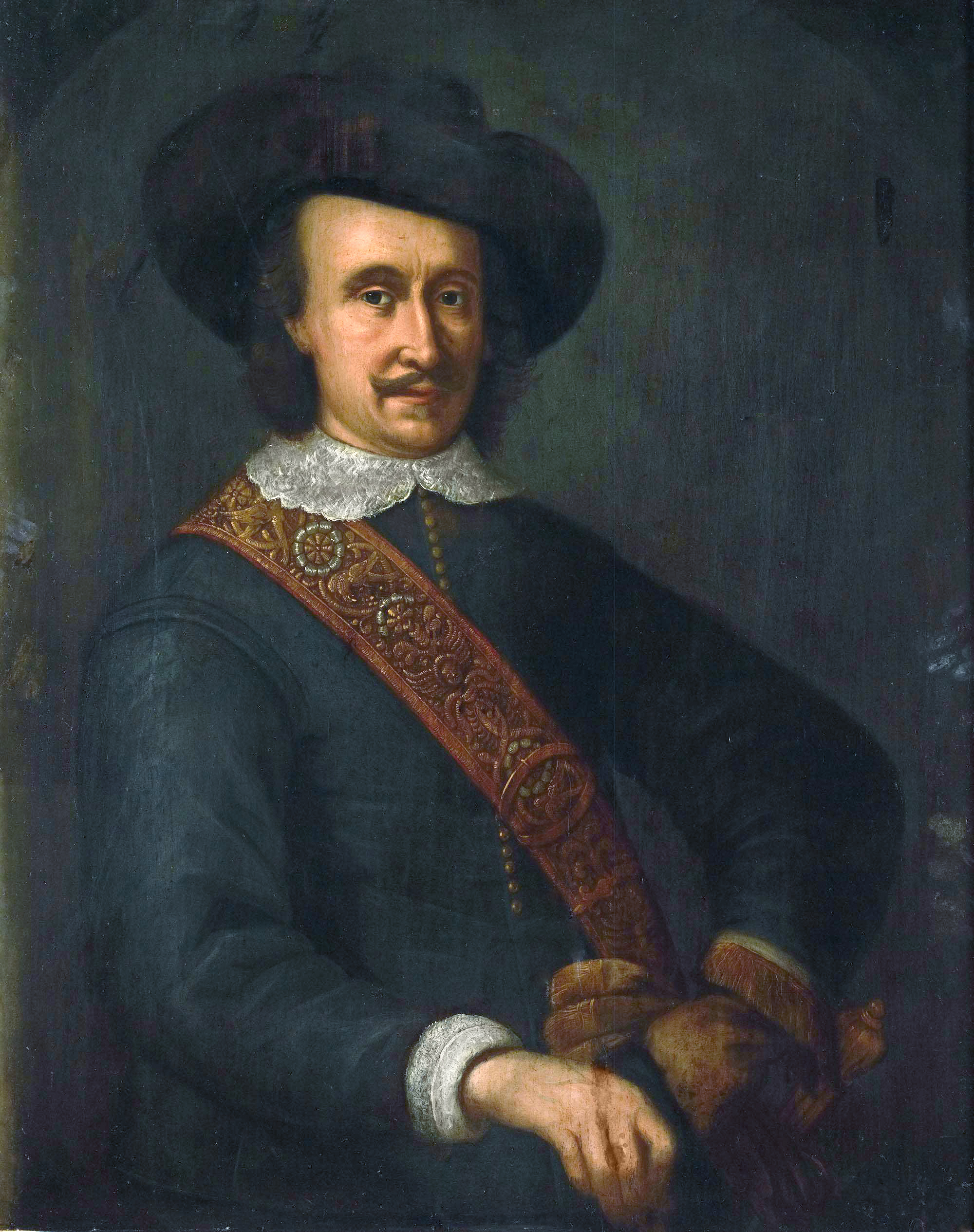
- Portrait of Cornelis van der Lijn

10th Governor-General of the Dutch East Indies
- In office 1646–1650
- Preceded by: Antonio van Diemen
- Succeeded by: Carel Reyniersz

Personal details
- Born: 1608 Alkmaar, Dutch Republic
- Died: 27 July 1679 (aged 71) Alkmaar, Dutch Republic
- Occupation: Colonial governor

Cornelis van der Lijn (1608 – 27 July 1679) was Governor-General of the Dutch East Indies from 1646 until 1650.

== Early career ==
Van der Lijn was born in Alkmaar, possibly in 1608. He went, in 1627, as assistant (Dutch: assistent) to Batavia, Dutch East Indies aboard the Wapen van Hoorn. From 1632 to 18 January 1636 he was accountant-general (Dutch: boekhouder-generaal). In 1639 he became counsellor-extraordinary (Dutch: Raad extra-oridinair) to the Council of the Indies. A year later he was appointed president of the Schepenrechtbank (a maritime court, but with various other functions). One further year later he was made a full counsellor (Dutch: Raad ordinair); he followed Philips Lucasz (whose portrait was painted by Rembrandt) as Director-General of the Indies.

== Council of the Indies ==
Shortly before his death on 19 April 1645, Governor-General Antonio van Diemen called upon the Dutch Council of the Indies (12 April 1645) to establish Cornelis van der Lijn as his successor. This was not in line with the instructions of the Seventeen Lords (Heren XVII), who has laid down in 1617 that immediately after the death of a governor-general, the council should choose a provisional governor-general. Only once the Seventeen Lords had agreed to the choice would the appointment come into actual force. The Heren XVII at first cancelled Van Diemen's decision, but then afterwards named the very same Cornelis van der Lijn as his successor. On 10 October 1646 he was named by them as governor-general.

Cornelis van der Lijn was not a strong ruler. He built a little on what his predecessor Van Diemen had established, but did not go much further. He signed peace treaties with Solor, Bantam and Mataram. Moreover, on 24 September 1646 he signed a (largely trade) agreement with the Prince of Mataram, the first of such contracts signed by the Dutch with Javanese rulers. Strenuous measures were taken to maintain the monopoly of the Dutch East India Company (VOC) in the Moluccas. After a fierce struggle, the fortress at Kapaha on Thitu Island (Hitu) was taken. The severe regulations would soon lead to riots.

The rulers in the Netherlands allowed Van der Lijn, at his own request, to retire with honour on 7 October 1650. Carel Reyniersz was then named as governor-general. In 1651, Cornelis van der Lijn left aboard the Prinses Royaal for the Netherlands. His reception in the homeland was as cool as his departure from the Indies. The customary reception and congratulations given to a returning fleet, and its commander were denied to him.

== Mayor of Alkmaar ==
He established himself in Alkmaar where he was elected mayor (Dutch: burgemeester) on 24 December 1668. He died there on 27 July 1679.
